= SuperB =

SuperB was a proposed high-luminosity electron-positron collider that was to be used as a B-factory. The project started around 2001 and it was cancelled by the Italian government on 27 November 2012. The collider was initially supposed to be built on University of Rome 'Tor Vergata' campus near Rome, Italy, under the supervision of the Istituto Nazionale di Fisica Nucleare. The location later changed to the site of Frascati National Laboratory (geographically, the change was only a few kilometers). The title SuperB referred to the fact that the collider was expected to produce very large quantities of B mesons.

In the initial Conceptual Design Report, the accelerator was conceived to be a circular (actually, quite hexagonal) double ring 2249 meters in circumference; it would have accelerated electrons to 7 GeV and positrons to 4 GeV before colliding them. The project suggested to cut cost by reusing hardware from the PEP-II accelerator, which was decommissioned before the proposed start of building of SuperB. Also the BaBar detector's components would be reused in the project. It was estimated that the building and commissioning of the collider would take 5 years. Not much was said about the location where accelerator would be built (apart from the accelerator being built in Italy, perhaps near Rome). At the back cover of CDR the intended location was shown to be the campus of University of Rome Tor Vergata.

In later plans, the accelerator changed shape into an ellipse shape with a linear injector part. The accelerator also became smaller, only 1250 meters in circumference (however the energies of the beams did not change), and finally the location changed to the site of Frascati National Laboratory. The plan was to have SuperB in an underground (quite shallow) tunnel below the Frascati National Laboratory's buildings. It was still planned to reuse PEP-II and BaBar hardware. The budget for the whole project was estimated to be of the order of 1 billion euro at the time of cancellation.

== Purpose ==
The designers hoped that SuperB would help to study the flavour sector of the Standard Model. SuperB was intended to give further information about any new physics found by the Large Hadron Collider. It may also have been able to check for sources of CP violation, which may contribute to an understanding of why the universe is full of matter and not antimatter. Accepted physical theory indicates that at the Big Bang equal quantities of matter and antimatter were created. However, when matter and antimatter meet they annihilate one another, so we should expect the universe to be empty. Physicists believe that CP violation may account for the discrepancy, and the designers hoped that SuperB may be able to throw light on the question. They expected that SuperB will be able to make much more precise checks for CP violation than has been possible in the past.

SuperB should have made it possible to observe matter and antimatter coexisting much as they did in the first moments of the universe, by means of the uncertainty principle. This situation is very unstable, and lasts for only a very brief time, but it was hoped to be able to take billions of quick glimpses, and thus build up a picture of what is happening.

== Computing ==
The collaboration was investigating the use of grid resources to deliver the computing power needed by the experiment. This was after the success of the LHC Computing Grid (wLCG) used by the LHC experiments. The SuperB VO has been using resources provided by INFN Grid, France Grilles, Polish Grid Infrastructure PL-Grid and GridPP.
