= SLinCA@Home =

BOINC based volunteer computing project researching LHC development

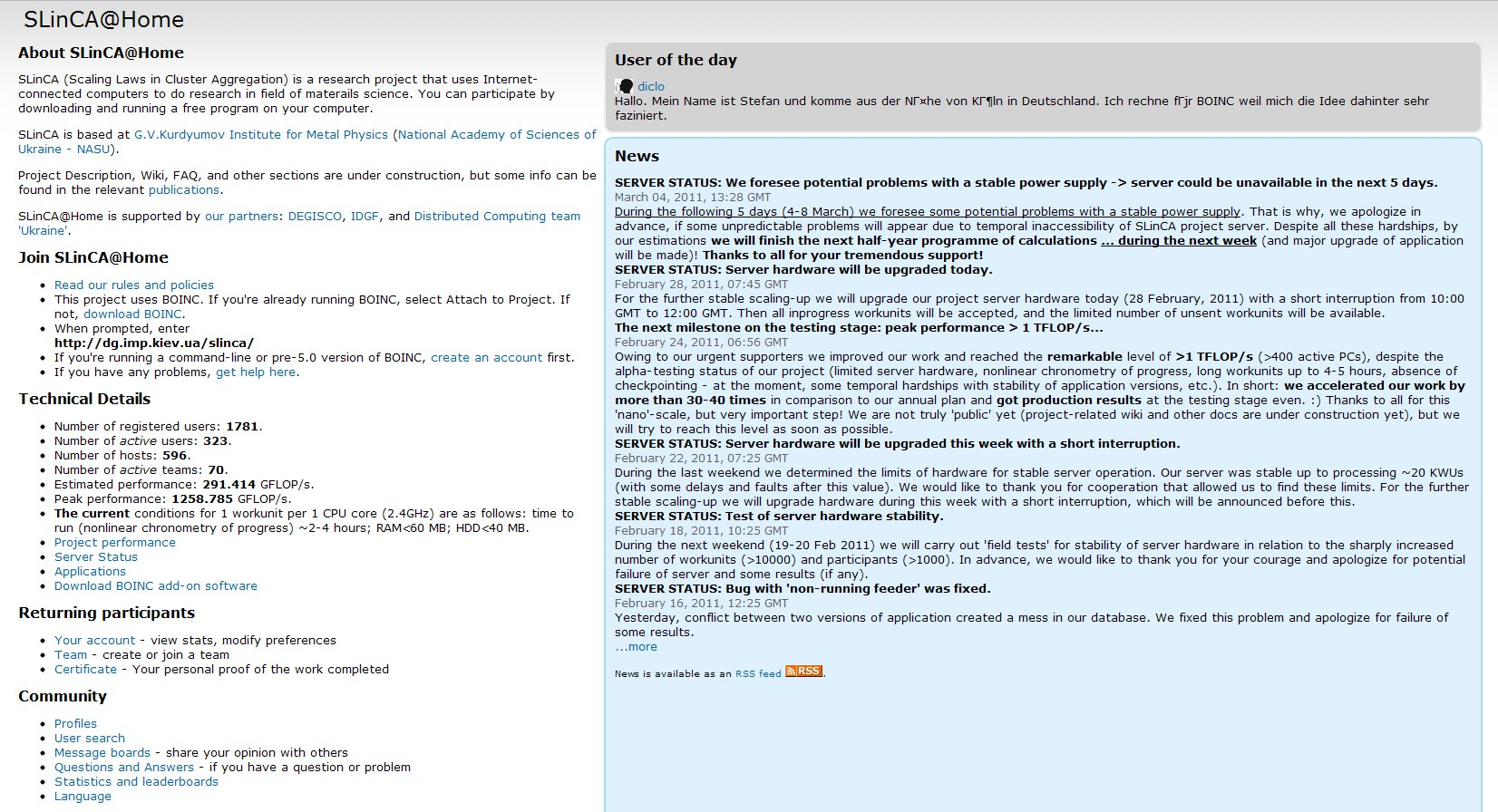
- Developer(s): IMP NASU
- Initial release: September 14, 2010
- Operating system: Linux, Windows
- Platform: BOINC, SZTAKI Desktop Grid, XtremWeb-HEP, OurGrid
- Type: Grid computing, Volunteer computing
- Website: dg.imp.kiev.ua

SLinCA@Home (Scaling Laws in Cluster Aggregation) was a research project that uses Internet-connected computers to do research in fields such as physics and materials science.

== Introduction ==
SLinCA@Home was based at the G. V. Kurdyumov Institute for Metal Physics (IMP) of the National Academy of Sciences of Ukraine (NASU) in Kyiv, Ukraine's capital city. It ran on the Berkeley Open Infrastructure for Network Computing (BOINC) software platform, the SZTAKI Desktop Grid platform, and the Distributed Computing API (DC-API) by SZTAKI. SLinCA@Home hosts several scientific applications dedicated to research into scale-invariant dependencies in experimental data in physics and materials science.

Statistics at the BOINCstats site (as of 16 March 2011), show over 2,000 volunteers in 39 countries have participated in the project; it is the second most popular BOINC project in Ukraine (after the Magnetism@Home project, which is now inactive). About 700 active users contribute about 0.5–1.5 teraFLOPS of computational power, which would rank SLinCA@Home among the top 20 on the TOP500 list of supercomputers in June 2005.

== History ==
The SLinCA@Home project was previously launched in January 2009 as part of the EGEE project in the European Union's Seventh Framework Programme (FP7) for the funding of research and technological development in Europe. During 2009–2010 it used the power of a local IMP Desktop Grid (DG), but from December 2010 it has been using the power of volunteer computing in solving the computationally intensive problems involved in research into scale-invariant dependencies in experimentally obtained and simulated scientific data. It is now operated by a group of scientists from IMP NASU in close cooperation with partners from IDGF and the 'Ukraine' Volunteer Computing team. From June 2010 SLinCA@Home has been under the framework of the DEGISCO FP7 EU project.

== Scientific Applications ==
The SLinCA@Home project was created to perform searches for and research into previously unknown scale-invariant dependencies using data from experiments and simulations.

An additional goal was the migration to the OurGrid platform for testing and demonstrating potential mechanisms of interoperation between worldwide communities with different DCI paradigms. The OurGrid platform is targeted at the support of peer-to-peer desktop grids; these are in nature very different from volunteer computing desktop grids such as the SZTAKI Desktop Grid.

== Partners ==
SLinCA@Home collaborates with:

- Partners in FP7 EU projects:
  - DEGISCO
  - EDGeS
- Communities participating in volunteer computing:
  - 'Ukraine' Volunteer Computing team
- Professional communities of experts in distributed computing:
  - International Desktop Grid Federation (IDGF).

== Awards ==
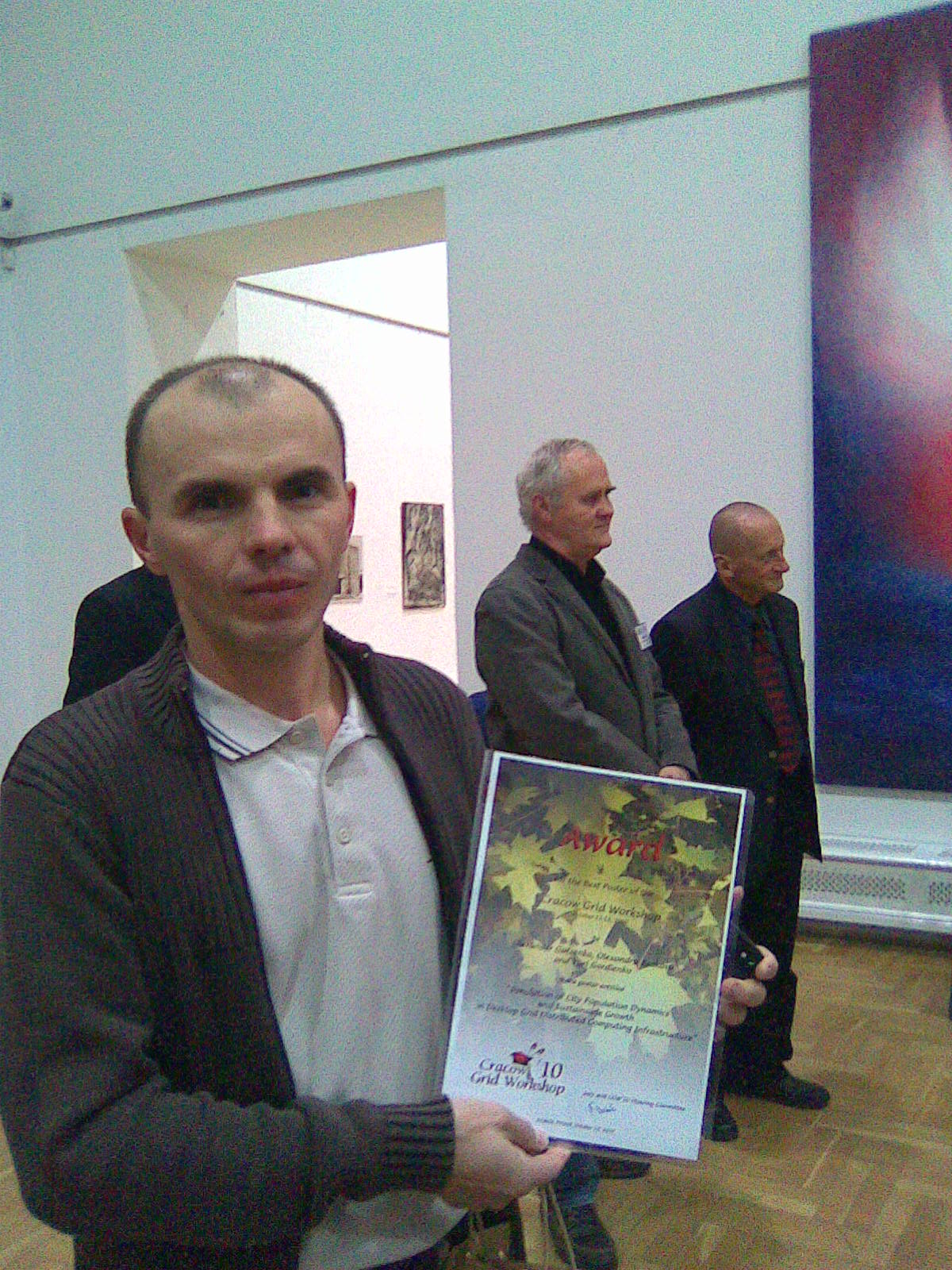
IDGF member Yuri Gordienko receives the 2nd best poster award at CGW'10

- 2009 – For the Best Poster of the Krakow Grid Workshop'09, Kraków, Poland (October 12–14, 2009) – the report on the concept and results of porting the MultiScaleIVideoP application with 4GL MATLAB-libraries to DCI on the basis of the BOINC SZTAKI Desktop Grid platform and the XtremWeb-HEP platform, in which the applicability of integrating MATLAB objects and code in a Desktop Grid for high-performance volunteer computing is demonstrated on the example of image and video processing in solid state physics and microscopy.
- 2010 – For the Best Poster of the Krakow Grid Workshop'10, Kraków, Poland (October 11–13, 2010) – the report on the concept and results of porting the CPDynSG application to DCI on the basis of the BOINC SZTAKI Desktop Grid platform, with comparisons of various theories' predictions with experimental observations, and typical scenarios of population dynamics and sustainable growth for different countries in Central and Eastern Europe.

== See also ==
- List of volunteer computing projects
