= List of grid computing projects =

Comprehensive list of Grid computing infrastructure projects

This is a comprehensive list of Grid computing infrastructure projects.

== Grid computing infrastructure projects ==
- BREIN uses the Semantic Web and multi-agent systems to build simple and reliable grid systems for business, with a focus on engineering and logistics management.
- A-Ware is developing a stable, supported, commercially exploitable, high quality technology to give easy access to grid resources.
- AssessGrid addresses obstacles to wide adoption of grid technologies by bringing risk management and assessment to this field, enabling use of grid computing in business and society.
- Cohesion Platform – A Java-based modular peer-to-peer multi-application desktop grid computing platform for irregularly structured problems developed at the University of Tübingen (Germany)
- The European Grid Infrastructure (EGI) – A series of projects funded by the European Commission which links over 70 institutions in 27 European countries to form a multi-science computing grid infrastructure for the European Research Area, letting researchers share computer resources
- GridCOMP provides an advanced component platform for an effective invisible grid.
- GridECON takes a user-oriented perspective and creates solutions to grid challenges to promote widespread use of grids.
- neuGRID develops a new user-friendly grid-based research e-infrastructure enabling the European neuroscience community to perform research needed for the pressing study of degenerative brain diseases, for example, Alzheimer's disease.
- OurGrid aims to deliver grid technology that can be used today by current users to solve present problems. To achieve this goal, it uses a different trade-off compared to most grid projects: it forfeits supporting arbitrary applications in favor of supporting only bag-of-tasks applications.
- ScottNet NCG – A distributed neural computing grid. A private commercial effort in continuous operation since 1995. This system performs a series of functions including data synchronization amongst databases, mainframe systems, and other data repositories. E-commerce transaction processing, automated research and data retrieval, content analysis, web site monitoring, scripted and dynamic user emulation, shipping and fulfillment API integration and management, RSS and NNTP monitoring and analysis, real time security enforcement, and backup/restore functions.
- BEinGRID Business Experiments in Grid.
- Legion – A grid computing platform developed at the University of Virginia.

== Open-source grid computing infrastructure projects ==
These projects attempt to make large physical computation infrastructures available for researchers to use:

- 3G Bridge An open-source core job bridging component between different grid infrastructures.
- Berkeley NOW Project.
- Debian Cluster Components.
- DiaGrid grid computing network centered at Purdue University.
- NESSI-GRID.
- OMII-Europe – An EU-funded project established to source key software components that can interoperate across several heterogeneous grid middleware platforms.
- OMII-UK Provide free open source software and support to enable a sustained future for the UK e-research community.
- Open Science Grid.
- SARA Computing and Networking Services in Netherlands.
- Storage@home Distributed storage infrastructure developed to solve the problem of backing up and sharing petabytes of scientific results using a distributed model of volunteer managed hosts. Project was discontinued in 2011.
- Worldwide LHC Computing Grid.
- The Extreme Science and Engineering Discovery Environment (XSEDE), formerly Teragrid.

== See also ==
- List of volunteer computing projects
- List of citizen science projects
- List of crowdsourcing projects
- List of free and open-source Android applications
