= National Grid Service =

National E-Infrastructure Service
- Predecessor: National Grid Service
- Formation: 2004
- Dissolved: 2011
- Location: United Kingdom

The National E-Infrastructure Service (NES), formerly the National Grid Service, was an organisation for UK academics and researchers from 2004 through 2011. It was funded by two governmental bodies, Engineering and Physical Sciences Research Council (EPSRC) and the Joint Information Systems Committee (JISC).

== Description ==
The NES provided compute and data resources accessed through a standard common set of services. NES services are based on the Globus Toolkit for job submission and the Storage Resource Broker for data management. NES resources hosted scientific software packages, including SIESTA and Gaussian. As well as providing access to compute and data resources, the NES offered training (through the National e-Science Centre in Edinburgh) and Grid support to all UK academics and researchers in grid computing.

NES had more than 500 users and twenty nine sites. The NES and GridPP were the two organisations that made up the UK NGI the organisation which was the UK's point of contact with the European Grid Infrastructure.

Prior to the NES, the UK e-Science programme funded a Grid Support Centre and later the Grid Operations Support Centre (GOSC). These provided support for end users to use and develop grid computing.

Following the UK Engineering Task Force developing the so-called 'Level 2 Grid', which was an ad hoc collection of individual institutes committing a variety of compute resources for grid computing, the NES was funded to develop this into a full service. Initially called the ETFp Grid, or Engineering Task Force Production Grid, it became known as the National Grid Service. Hardware was purchased and installed by February 2004, and a web site appeared by April 2004. During phase 1, from October 2004 to September 2006, it worked with the separately funded Grid Operations Support Centre (GOSC). By the start of phase two in October 2006, the NGS and the GOSC merged under the single project name NES. The NES had a third phase which ran through September 2011.

== Services ==
The NES provided free-to-use services to UK academic researchers:

- The UK e-Science Certificate Authority, which provides digital certificates to identify UK Grid users.
- A web portal which provided a graphical method for submitting jobs.
- A resource broker, which can determine the best site or cluster for a submitted job based on its requirements and the current workloads.
- GSI-SSHTerm, a Java-based terminal used to give command-line access NES resources using Grid Security Infrastructure Secure Shell.
- Oracle databases.
- Another portal, based on P-GRADE Portal technology, for creation, execution and monitoring of sequential and parallel jobs.

=== Partner Sites ===
The NES had the following partner sites:

- Cardiff University
- University of Glasgow Computing Service
- University of Glasgow ScotGrid
- Lancaster University
- University of Manchester
- University of Oxford
- Queen's University Belfast
- Rutherford Appleton Laboratory (STFC/RAL)
- University of Westminster
- White Rose Grid (University of Leeds)

=== Affiliate Sites ===
Affiliate sites provided resources to the NES but with more conditions. Sometimes they provide access to their own users through the common NGS interfaces. Members of the GridPP collaboration also offered resources.

- University of Birmingham (GridPP)
- University of Bristol
- Brunel University (GridPP)
- Durham University (GridPP)
- University of Edinburgh (ECDF)
- University of Huddersfield
- Imperial College London (GridPP)
- Keele University
- University of Liverpool(GridPP)
- University of Manchester (GridPP)
- University of Oxford (GridPP)
- Queen Mary, University of London (GridPP)
- University of Reading
- Royal Holloway, University of London (GridPP)
- University of Sheffield
- University of Southampton
- STFC SCARF
- STFC Ceramics and Minerals Consortium (Mott) VO
- University of York (White Rose Grid at York)

== Research ==
All academics in the UK could apply for a free account on the NES. The science and research ranged from the permeation of drugs through a membrane to the welfare of ethnic minority groups in the United Kingdom. Other applications included modelling the coastal oceans, modelling of HIV mutations, research into cameras for imaging patients during cancer treatments and simulating galaxy formation.

As an example use of NES, "The motivation, methodology and implementation of an e-Social Science pilot demonstrator project entitled: Grid Enabled Micro-econometric Data Analysis (GEMEDA). This used the NES to investigate a policy relevant social science issue: the welfare of ethnic minority groups in the United Kingdom. The underlying problem is that of a statistical analysis that uses quantitative data from more than one source. The application of grid technology to this problem allows one to integrate elements of the required empirical modelling process: data extraction, data transfer, statistical computation and results presentation, in a manner that is transparent to a casual user".

Examples of research using the NES were published in 2006 through 2011.
