= European Middleware Initiative =

EMI
- Developers: EMI Project, partially funded by EU grant RI-261611
- Stable release: 3.0 / 28 February 2013
- Operating system: Scientific Linux 5 64bit, Scientific Linux 6 64bit, Debian 6 64bit
- Type: Grid computing
- License: Multiple. Each product has its own. Most of them are Apache or BSD.
- Website: www.eu-emi.eu (not active anymore)

The European Middleware Initiative (EMI) was a computer software platform for high performance distributed computing. It was developed and distributed directly by the EMI project. It was the base for other grid middleware distributions used by scientific research communities and distributed computing infrastructures all over the world especially in Europe, South America and Asia. EMI supported broad scientific experiments and initiatives, such as the Worldwide LHC Computing Grid (for the Large Hadron Collider).

The EMI middleware was a cooperation among three general purpose grid platforms, the Advanced Resource Connector, gLite and UNICORE and the dCache storage software.

The project ended on 30 April 2013.

== Purpose ==
The purpose of the EMI distribution is to consolidate, harmonize and support the original software platforms, evolve and extend them. Redundant or duplicate services resulting from the merging are deprecated, in favour of new services added to satisfy user requirements or specific consolidation needs, standardizing and developing common interfaces. These include the adoption of a common structure for accounting, resource information exchange or authentication and authorization.

Input for the development activities is taken from users, infrastructures projects, standardization initiatives or changing technological innovations. The software products will be adapted as necessary to comply with standard open-source guidelines to facilitate the integration in mainstream operating system distributions.

== Collaborations ==
A cooperation with FutureGrid, a US distributed testbed for Clouds, Grids and high-performance computing, was announced in December 2011.

In January 2012, the EMI project formalized a partnership with the iMarine project to create an open data e-infrastructure for fisheries management and marine conservation.

== Users ==
By 2008 the EMI software distribution provided most of the middleware components which support the execution and completion of the millions of computational jobs handled by the 350 centers of the European Grid Infrastructure and the tens of petabytes of data transfers occurring between the storage systems of those centers.

EMI middleware was used in the WLCG infrastructure which supports, for example, the search for the Higgs boson (the God Particle) and new types of matter searches of the physicists at LHC together with other research in astronomy, biology, computational chemistry and other sciences.

== License ==
There is no common EMI license though all licenses used by EMI are open-source. Each product has a long history behind its own license. Most are Apache or BSD.

dCache products are released under the dCache Software License but they adopted the Affero General Public License from 1 January 2012.

== Products ==
The EMI products (components of the release) can be grouped in four categories (areas): computing, data, security and infrastructure.

The first release of the software is composed of 56 products packaged for Scientific Linux 5 (32, 64bit).

The second release is also made of 56 products which are available for Scientific Linux 5 64bit and Scientific Linux 6 64bit. A subset of services is also available for Debian 6 64bit with more planned with the updates.

The third and final release contains 61 products for the Scientific Linux 5 64bit (480 packages), Scientific Linux 6 64bit (474 packages) and Debian 6 (233 packages) Linux distributions. All components are supported on the Scientific Linux platforms while some are not on Debian.
