= Róbert Lovas =

Hungarian computer scientist

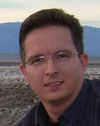
- Scientific career
- Fields: Computer Science, Cloud Computing
- Workplaces: SZTAKI, Hungary

Róbert Lovas is a Hungarian computer scientist at SZTAKI, Budapest, Hungary.

== Biography ==
Lovas was born in Hungary. He received his MSc degree in electrical engineering in 1998, and PhD degree in informatics at the Budapest University of Technology and Economics in 2006. He is currently the Deputy Director of the Institute for Computer Science and Control (SZTAKI).

== Research interests ==
- High-level programming languages, workflow-oriented tools, and integrated software engineering environments (covering the entire life cycle) for parallel, distributed, and Grid systems,
- Clusters, supercomputers, Grid systems and their applications in science and business areas,
- Automated correctness debugging of parallel and distributed programs including specification, formal modelling, verification, replay/active control, and execution visualisation techniques.

== Scientific merits ==
From 1997 he has been involved in several national (ChemistryGrid, HAGRID, WEB2GRID), intergovernmental bilateral, and European research projects in the Framework Programmes 4-7 (FP4: WINPAR; FP5: CAST; FP6: GridCoord, EGEE-I-II, CancerGrid, CoreGrid; FP7: Enabling Desktop Grids for e-Science (EDGeS), ETICS-II, EGEE-III).

In the HARNESS project (US/DoE) he worked as an exchange researcher at the Department of Math and Computer Science, Emory University (Georgia, Atlanta) in 2000. He has long-running experience in ICT collaborations with academic organizations, universities, and enterprises from various application areas of meteorology, biotechnology, computational chemistry, and telecommunication. He is a co-author or co-editor of more than 35 scientific papers and books on parallel software engineering and Grid computing particularly from design, debugging and application aspects. As lecturer and tutor, he gave more than 100 presentations and demonstrations on international scientific events, meetings, and exhibitions in Europe, the USA, and Asia.

He has received the following awards and scholarships:

- 2011 Exhibit Third Prize at FET11 - The European Future Technologies Conference and Exhibition (awarded by the European Commission)
- 2008 Institute Award, Computer and Automation Research Institute of the Hungarian Academy of Sciences
- 2002 Award of Aspirants and PhD Students (1st place in the 3rd year), Computer and Automation Research Institute of the Hungarian Academy of Sciences
- 2002 Excellent Talk Award. The Third Conference of PhD Students in Computer Science, Hungary
- 2000 Research Scholarship (6 months): Department of Math & Computer Science, Emory University, Atlanta, GA, USA

He is the coordinator of the European DEGISCO project, a member of the Technical Committee of the Hungarian Grid Competence Center, and the Grid Application Support Center (MTA SZTAKI/GASuC). He was the deputy member of the Project Management Board of the European ETICS-2 consortium, and the Scientific Steering Committee of the CANCERGRID project; and the activity leader of the European EDGeS research infrastructure project. He acts as International Liaison (NIL) in the European Grid Infrastructure project and as a Secretary of the Stichting International Desktop Grid Federation.

== Selected publications ==
- Balaton et al. 2008: EDGeS: the common boundary between service and desktop grids. In: Grid computing, achievements and prospects. (CoreGrid integration workshop 2008)
- Kacsuk, Lovas, Németh (Eds.). 2008: Distributed and Parallel Systems. In Focus: Desktop Grid Computing. Springer US
- Lovas and Kacsuk. 2007: Correctness debugging of message passing programs using model verification techniques. In: Recent Advances in Parallel Virtual Machine and Message Passing Interface. Proc. of 14th European PVM/MPI User’s Group Meeting
- Lovas et al. 2007: GRID superscalar enabled P-GRADE portal. In: Integrated Research in GRID Computing. Proc. of CoreGRID Integration Workshop 2005 (Selected Papers)
- Lovas. 2006: Enhanced debugging methods for parallel and metacomputing applications based on macrosteps. PhD thesis, Budapest University of Technology and Economics
- Lovas and Vécsei. 2005: Integration of Formal Verification and Debugging Methods in P-GRADE Environment. In Juhász et al. (Eds): Distributed and Parallel Systems. cluster and Grid Computing. Springer
- Lovas et al. 2004: Workflow Support for Complex Grid Applications: Integrated and Portal Solutions. In: Grid Computing. Proc. of Second European AcrossGrids Conference, AxGrids 2004 (Revised Papers)
- Németh et al. 2004: The P-GRADE grid portal. In: Computational science and its applications: Proc. of ICCSA 2004
- Kacsuk et al. 2003: Demonstration of P-GRADE job-mode for the Grid. In: Euro-Par 2003 Parallel Processing. Proc. of 9th International Euro-Par Conference
- Lovas et al. 2002: Application of P-grade development environment in meteorology. In: Kacsuk et al. (Eds.): Distributed and parallel systems. Cluster and grid computing. Springer
- Lovas and Sunderam. 2002: Debugging of metacomputing applications. In: Proc. of 16th international parallel and distributed processing symposium. IPDPS 2002.
- Kovács et al. 2002: Integrating temporal assertions into a parallel debugger. In: Euro-Par 2002. Parallel processing. Proc. of 8th international Euro-Par conference.
- Lovas and Sunderam. 2001: Extension of macrostep debugging methodology towards metacomputing applications. Computational science - Proc. of ICCS 2001 International conference
- Kacsuk et al. 2001: The GRADE graphical parallel programming environment. In: Cunha et al. (Eds.): Parallel program development for cluster computing: methodology, tools and integrated environments. Nova Science Publishers, Inc., NY, USA
- Dózsa et al. 2000: Translation of a high-level graphical code to message-passing primitives in the GRADE programming environment. In: Recent Advances in Parallel Virtual Machine and Message Passing Interface Proc. of 7th European PVM/MPI Users’ Group Meeting
- Kacsuk et al. 1999: Systematic debugging of parallel programs in DIWIDE based on collective breakpoints and macrosteps.In: Euro-Par '99. Parallel processing. Proc. of 5th international Euro-Par conference
- Kacsuk et al. 1998: The GRED graphical editor for the GRADE parallel program development environment. In: Proc. of High-performance computing and networking. International conference and exhibition
- Bäcker et al. 1998: WINPAR - Windows-based parallel computing. In: Parallel computing: Fundamentals, applications and new directions. Proc. of ParCo '97

== Invited and keynote speeches ==
Selected invited and keynote speeches at scientific events:

- 2011: Seminar & Workshop: Desktop GRID Computing (Bandung, Indonesia)
- 2010: The 5th International Conference on Ubiquitous Information TEchnologies & Applications - CUTE 2010 (Sanya, China)
- 2010: Workshop on Using High Performance Computing (HPC) in Scientific Problems Computation (Damascus, Syria)
- 2009: International Symposium on Distributed Computing and Applications to Business, Engineering and Science - DCABES 2009 (Wuhan, China)

== Media Appearances ==
Selected media appearances with links to audio/video/text material:

- 01/03/2013 : Költségkímélő informatikai megoldás (Gyártástrend - Issue Dec 2012)
- 11/02/2011 : First release of Desktop Grids for eScience Road Map (iSGTW)
- 2010. No 4 : Conferences, meetings (JINR NEWS)
- 05.27.2007 : Interview with Robert Lovas in NTN TV (Іноземці)
- 09.25.2003 : Áttörést jelentő Grid szakmai nap (Prim Online)
- 03.13.2000 : Interview with Robert Lovas and Peter Inzelt in Duna TV (Virradóra)

== See also ==
- Grid Computing
