= Polish Grid Infrastructure PL-Grid =

Polish computing infrastructure

Polish Grid Infrastructure PL-Grid, a nationwide computing structure, built in 2009–2011, under the scientific project PL-Grid – Polish Infrastructure for Supporting Computational Science in the European Research Space. Its purpose was to enable scientific research based on advanced computer simulations and large-scale computations using the computer clusters, and to provide convenient access to the computer resources for research teams, also outside the communities, in which the high performance computing centers operate.

== History ==
In the first decade of the twenty-first century in most European countries advanced grid programs have been created. Besides, the European and worldwide consolidation took place in form of various projects, which concerned the grid technology and HPC: EGEE, e-IRG, PRACE, DEISA and OMII-Europe.

Poland has also undertaken efforts to build the National Grid, because without such infrastructure it would not be possible for Polish scientific communities to participate in many research programs, particularly in the EU 7th Framework Programme. Another reason to initiate steps towards the Polish Grid creation was that in Poland the number of intensively cooperating, geographically dispersed research teams, was increasing. In case of such cooperation, tools for gathering and sharing of accumulated knowledge on a global scale were essential.

In 2007, with the support of almost all European countries, EGI Design Study project was created. Its goal was to prepare the rules of integration of national Grids (National Grid Initiatives) in Europe into a stable, production infrastructure – European Grid Initiative – which would begin its operation in 2010. It helped start work on establishing National Grid Initiative in Poland already in 2007, by setting up the PL-Grid Consortium.

== PL-Grid Consortium, project and infrastructure ==
The PL-Grid Consortium was established by five Polish supercomputing and networking centers:

- Academic Computer Centre Cyfronet AGH, Kraków (the coordinator)
- Interdisciplinary Centre for Mathematical and Computational Modelling, Warsaw University, Warsaw
- Poznan Supercomputing and Networking Center, Poznań
- Information Center of the Academic Computer Network, Gdańsk
- Wroclaw Centre for Networking and Supercomputing, Wrocław

From 2009 to 2011, the activity of the Consortium was supported by the PL-Grid project, co-funded by the European Regional Development Fund within the Innovative Economy Operational Programme.

The result of the operation of the Consortium was the establishment of the Polish Grid Infrastructure PL-Grid, formed by the merger of new, powerful computational resources, purchased and installed in the data centers belonging to the PL-Grid Consortium.

== Computational resources ==
Computational resources available in the Polish Grid Infrastructure PL-Grid include (at the end of the PL-Grid project): 5.8 PBytes of storage capacity and 588 TFlops of computing power. One of the clusters within Polish Grid Infrastructure is Zeus – a supercomputer installed in Academic Computer Centre Cyfronet AGH University of Science and Technology in Kraków – in 2010, 2011 and 2012, the most efficient supercomputer in Poland.

== Enabled software packages ==
On the PL-Grid infrastructure resources there are available scientific software packages which allow researchers in the field of biology, quantum chemistry, physics, numerical computations and simulation to conduct large-scale computations: ADF, AMBER, AutoDock, BLAST, Blender, CFOUR, Clustal, CPMD, Dalton, FLUENT, GAMESS, Gaussian, GROMACS, Mathematica, Matlab, Meep, MOLPRO, MOPAC, NAMD, NWChem, OpenFOAM, POV-Ray, R and TURBOMOLE.

== Implemented tools ==
Within the PL-Grid infrastructure, there are available several tools that support design and running the scientific applications on the distributed computational resources, organization of computational experiments, visualization of applications' results and resources management: g-Eclipse, GridSpace2, QosQosGrid and Migrating Desktop.

Aside from user-end tools, several software packages for administrators have also been developed, namely ACARM-ng and KeyFS. These security-related projects are also useful as a standalone solutions, being PL-Grid's contribution to an open source community.

== Innovation ==
The creation of the national grid infrastructure was an enterprise with very large potential of innovation, mentioned in all government documents setting the direction of development for Polish science, technology and economy. To fulfill the aim of "Growth of the competitiveness of the Polish science," of the Innovative Economy Operational Program, the science sector needed to be strengthened through the provision of a suitable research base. The grid infrastructure constituted such a base, on which the specialized systems specific for various fields of science were created, involving services and tools oriented towards the types of applications used.

The Polish Grid Infrastructure is continuously maintained and extended within the PLGrid Plus project (2012–2014): "Domain-oriented services and resources of Polish Infrastructure for Supporting Computational Science in the European Research Space – PLGrid Plus". Its most important task is preparation of specific computing environments – so called domain grids – i.e., solutions, services and extended infrastructure (including software), tailored to the needs of different groups of scientists.

== See also ==
- Computer cluster
- Grid computing
