= Italian Grid Infrastructure =

Grid computing initiative

The INFN Grid project was an initiative of the Istituto Nazionale di Fisica Nucleare (INFN) —Italy's National Institute for Nuclear Physics—for grid computing. It was intended to develop and deploy grid middleware services to allow INFN's users to transparently and securely share the computing and storage resources together with applications and technical facilities for scientific collaborations.

With the beginning of the European Grid Infrastructure (EGI) project in 2010, the activities of INFN Grid were consolidated into the Italian Grid Infrastructure (IGI) which operates as a European joint research unit (JRU) formally supported by the Italian Ministry for University and Research (MIUR) and the European Commission.

== History ==
The INFN Grid project, approved in late 1999, developed and deployed the first Italian Grid Infrastructure. Based on GARR, the Italian national research and education network, it became integrated with other grid infrastructures. It included more than 30 sites, such as Italian universities and, although primarily focused on physics, was open to other fields of research (such as bio-medicine and earth observation) and to industry.

With a grant received from MIUR-FIRB funds (governmental funds for investment in fundamental research) for the Grid.it project, INFN with other national research institutions led to the 2002 development of a production grid infrastructure supporting Italian research called Grid.it.

In collaboration with CERN, other European countries and industries, in 2001 INFN Grid launched the largest FP5 European grid project, DataGrid, for an infrastructure supporting the European research area (ERA). With the same partners it promoted the Data TransAtlantic Grid (DataTAG) project, which provided interoperability with a grid for science with US and Asian-Pacific areas from 2001 through 2003.

The Experiment Computing Grid Integration working group represented the Italian contribution to the development of middleware by testing the gLite software and providing user documentation.

== International projects ==
INFN Grid contributed to:

International projects
Name	Description	Duration/Start Date	Notes
EGI DS	The European Grid Initiative Design Study	2007–2009	Funded by the EU under the 7th Framework Programme
BioinfoGRID	Bioinformatics Grid Applications for life sciences	2006–2008	-
COREGRID	-	2004–2008	-
CYCLOPS	-	-	-
NOBEL	-	-	-
EUIndiaGRID	-	-	-

Older projects include:

- GridCC, Grid enabled Remote Instrumentation with Distributed Control and Computation (2005–2007).
- EDG, European Data Grid (2001–2004).

== Software development ==
Software components developed within the INFN Grid project include:

- CEMon – responsible for providing information coming from the computing element (CE)
- CONStanza – a replica consistency service that maintains consistency of writable replicated data
- CREAM – Computing Resource Execution And Management Service for job management operation at the computing element (CE) level
- DGAS – an accounting service that accumulates information about the usage of grid resources by the users and by groups of users, including virtual organizations as groups of users
- GLUE Schema – a model for grid resources and mapping to concrete schemes that can be used in grid information services
- Grid2Win – a project aiming to create a gLite user interface (UI) and a gLite computing element (CE) running on Microsoft Windows
- GriDICE – a distributed monitoring tool designed for grid systems. It promotes the adoption of de facto standard grid information service interfaces, protocols and data models.
- WMS – Workload Management System, middleware for distribution and management of tasks across grid resources
