= European Union's OSCARS =

OSCARS (Open Science Clusters' Action for Research and Society) is a European research-infrastructure project funded through the European Union's Horizon Europe programme. The project began on 1 January 2024 and is scheduled to end on 30 June 2028. It is coordinated by the French National Centre for Scientific Research and has a budget of approximately €25 million.

OSCARS promotes open science and the adoption of the FAIR principles for research data across the European Research Area. It brings together research infrastructures from five thematic science clusters covering environmental sciences, life sciences, astronomy and particle physics, photon and neutron science, and the social sciences and humanities.

The project supports the development of interoperable data services and participation in the European Open Science Cloud. It also distributed approximately €16 million through two open calls supporting 70 open-science projects and services.
