= GridPP =

- Formation: September 2001
- Location: United Kingdom
- Website: www.gridpp.ac.uk

GridPP is a collaboration of particle physicists and computer scientists from the United Kingdom and CERN. They manage and maintain a distributed computing grid across the UK with the primary aim of providing resources to particle physicists working on the Large Hadron Collider (LHC) experiments at CERN. They are funded by the UK's Science and Technology Facilities Council. The collaboration oversees a major computing facility called the Tier1 at the Rutherford Appleton Laboratory (RAL) along with the four Tier 2 organisations of ScotGrid, NorthGrid, SouthGrid and LondonGrid (formerly LT2). The Tier 2s are geographically distributed and are composed of computing clusters at multiple institutes.

As of 2012 the GridPP infrastructure spans 18 UK institutions and is major partner in the UK's National Grid Initiative as a part of the European Grid Infrastructure.

== Background ==
The original GridPP plan was drawn up in late 2000 to provide the UK's contribution to the LHC Computing Grid and the EuropeanDataGrid project (now the European Grid Infrastructure). The drive behind these projects was to provide researchers working on the LHC experiments with suitable computing resources and to extend the use of the technology to other communities. The first GridPP proposal was accepted by PPARC, at the time the UK funding council responsible for funding particle physics related projects, and the collaboration officially began on 1 September 2001 with £17m of funding. During this first phase of GridPP (2001 to 2004) the collaboration built the UK testbed, a working prototype for a grid that was linked to other similar systems around the world. In preparation for its use as a production infrastructure it analysed real data from a wide variety of experiments being run around the world in different institutions. In 2004 it was extended until September 2007 to bring it up to the proposed LHC switch on date. By 2007 GridPP was a fully functioning production service but the LHC switch on was still a year away so in September 2007 it received a further extension from STFC, receiving £30m of funding until March 2011.

== Current state of the project ==
GridPP is in its fourth phase (2011–2014) having received more funding from the Science and Technology Facilities Council (STFC) to support the LHC experiments and other users. In late 2011 the project is providing over 29,000 CPUs and 25,000TB of storage to the worldwide grid infrastructure.

=== Members ===
All of the UK universities and institutions with researchers working on the LHC are members. As of 2011 the list is as follows:

==== ScotGrid ====
ScotGrid is based across 3 main sites and primarily supports on-going research within the field of Particle Physics. The entire environment is monitored, maintained and developed by dedicated teams at each site, to ensure a fully operational system is available to the end user communities.

- Durham University
- University of Edinburgh
- University of Glasgow

==== NorthGrid ====
- Lancaster University
- University of Liverpool
- University of Manchester
- University of Sheffield

==== SouthGrid ====
- University of Birmingham
- University of Bristol
- University of Cambridge
- The Rutherford Appleton Laboratory
- University of Oxford
- University of Sussex

==== LondonGrid ====
LondonGrid is a joint collaboration of 5 institutes in the London region to provide high performance computing resources to the high energy physics community.

- Brunel University, West London
- Imperial College London
- Queen Mary, University of London
- Royal Holloway, University of London

== Research supported by GridPP ==
=== Currently supported ===
GridPP supports many disciplines and projects. This is a list of the different experiments or projects that actively use GridPP resources.

==== LHC experiments ====
GridPP was originally created to support the experiments based at CERN using the LHC. The 4 main experiments supported are:

- ALICE
- ATLAS
- CMS
- LHCb

==== High energy physics ====
Alongside the experiments at the LHC GridPP also supports other international high energy physics experiments. These include:

- CLIC
- MICE
- SNO+
- SuperB
- T2K
- NA62 experiment at CERN

==== Physics ====
- PhenoGrid a UK project investigating Phenomenology
- UKQCD — a UK project investigating Quantum Chromodynamics
- ITER

==== Other disciplines ====
GridPP, through the European Grid Infrastructure and its own efforts, supports many non-physics research disciplines.

- The MoSSaiC project, investigating the management of landslide hazards in the Tropics
- The UK's National eInfrastructure for Social Simulation's GENESIS project which uses the grid infrastructure to simulate a populations in cities and regions in-silico.
- The ENROLLER providing language and literature researchers access to text collections and computing resources.

=== Previously supported ===
==== Other disciplines ====
- WISDOM a French-based project looking at cures for avian flu and malaria.
- PEGASUS – Particle Physicists Engagement with Grids: A Socio-technical Usability Study, a sociology study of the collaboration carried out by the London School of Economics which resulted in a framework of qualifying guidance for others engaged in developed grids as well as 15 papers, 4 posters and used in 3 MSc dissertations.
- Econophysica – A small company who worked with researchers at Queen Mary, University of London looking at mathematical models for commodity trading. The work with GridPP received funding from the STFC Mini PIPPS scheme to look into the feasibility of their algorithmic trading platform being deployed on the Grid.

== Related projects ==
- LHC Computing Grid
- European Grid Infrastructure
- National Grid Service
