= Amga =

Amga or AMGA may refer to:

- Amga (rural locality), a rural locality (a selo) in the Amginsky District of the Sakha Republic, Russia
- Amga (river), a river in the Sakha Republic, Russia
- American Medical Group Association (AMGA)
- American Mountain Guides Association (AMGA)
- GLite-AMGA, a general purpose metadata catalogue
- Armenian Media Group of America, also known as “AMGA” or “amga”, Armenian-American TV channel organization, founded in 1999

== See also ==
- Verkhnyaya Amga, a rural locality (a selo) in the Aldansky District of the Sakha Republic, Russia
- Amginsky District, a district of the Sakha Republic, Russia
