= LingCloud =

- Developers: Institute of Computing Technology, Chinese Academy of Sciences
- Stable release: 0.9 / 31 August 2011; 14 years ago
- Preview release: 0.9.1 / 22 December 2011; 14 years ago
- Written in: Java
- Operating system: Linux
- Platform: x64
- Available in: English, Simplified Chinese
- License: Apache License 2.0
- Website: lingcloud.org

LingCloud is a suite of open-source cloud computing system software developed by Institute of Computing Technology, Chinese Academy of Sciences. It is licensed under Apache License 2.0. LingCloud provides a resource single leasing point system for consolidated leasing physical and virtual machines, and supports various heterogeneous application modes including high performance computing, large scale data processing, massive data storage, etc. on shared infrastructure. LingCloud can help an organization to build private cloud to manage the computing infrastructure.

LingCloud is based on Xen virtualization platform and uses OpenNebula to manage the virtual infrastructure.

== Components ==
The main components of LingCloud release include:

- Molva – The core of LingCloud. It is an elastic computing infrastructure management software providing a heterogeneous resource management and leasing framework, and a single controlling point of both of the infrastructure and applications.
- Portal – System management interface via web. Current modules include:
  - Infrastructure management: physical and virtual machines management by partitions and clusters.
  - Application encapsulation: virtual appliance creation and management.
  - System monitor: clusters run-time information monitor.

== Release history ==
The open-source version of LingCloud was released in May 2011.

| Version | Release date | Note |
|---|---|---|
| 0.8 | 28 May 2011 | |
| 0.9 | 31 August 2011 | |
| 0.9.1 | 22 December 2011 | |

== See also ==
- OpenNebula
- CNGrid
