= Ying Lu =

Ying Lu is an associate professor of computer science and engineering at the University of Nebraska–Lincoln.

== Life ==
Lu received her Ph.D. in computer science from the University of Virginia, Charlottesville, in 2005. She then began her work at the University of Nebraska–Lincoln as an assistant professor.

== Work ==
Lu's areas of interest are adaptive real-time systems, autonomic computing, and grid computing, among others. Ying Lu has been a technical program committee member several times, some of which include the "IEEE Real-Time Systems Symposium" from 2006–2008, and the International Workshop on Cyber-Physical Systems" in 2008. She was also the publicity co-chair for "The 14th International Workshop on Parallel and Distributed Real-time Systems" in 2006, and the work in progress chair for the "IREE Real-Time and Embedded Technology and Applications Symposium" in 2008.

Lu is the author or co-author of more than 25 technical papers, including:

- "Partitioned Multiprocessor Scheduling of Mixed-Criticality Period Jobs" (2014)
- "Energy Analysis of Hadoop Cluster Failure Recovery" (2013)
- "Efficient Real-Time Divisible Loads with Advanced Reservations" (2012)
- "TCP Congestion Avoidance Algorithm Identification" (2011)
- "Automatic Data Placement and Replication in Grids" (2009)
- "Adaptive Consistency Guarantees for Large-Scale Replicated Services" (2008)
- "Queuing Model Based Network Server Performance Control" (2002)
