= BDII =

Information system for Grid Computing infrastructures

- Developers: Laurence Field, David Horat, Maria Alandes (CERN)
- Stable release: 5.2.12 / 9 August 2012
- Operating system: Scientific Linux 5, 6
- Type: Grid computing
- License: Apache License, Version 2.0
- Website: https://tomtools.cern.ch/confluence/display/IS/Home

The BDII, which stands for Berkeley Database Information Index, is an information system for Grid Computing infrastructures. It consists of a standard LDAP server which is updated by an external process. The update process obtains LDIF from a number of sources and merges them. It then compares this to the contents of the database and creates an LDIF file of the differences. This is then used to update the database.

It uses an LDAP implementation of the Grid Laboratory Uniform Environment data model.

The BDII was originally developed as part of the European DataGrid project.

== See also ==
- Grid Computing
- Grid Laboratory Uniform Environment
- LDAP
- CERN
