= Jungle computing =

Type of distributed computing

Jungle computing is a form of high performance computing that distributes computational work across cluster, grid and cloud computing.

The increasing complexity of the high performance computing environment has provided a range of choices beside traditional supercomputers and clusters. Scientists can now use grid and cloud infrastructures, in a variety of combinations along with traditional supercomputers - all connected via fast networks. And the emergence of many-core technologies such as GPUs, as well as supercomputers on chip within these environments has added to the complexity. Thus, high-performance computing can now use multiple diverse platforms and systems simultaneously, giving rise to the term "computing jungle".

== See also ==
- Heterogeneous computing
