= Pegasus (workflow management) =

Workflow management system

- Developers: University of Southern California, Information Sciences Institute, University of Wisconsin-Madison
- Stable release: 5.0 Beta1 / July 27, 2020; 5 years ago
- Written in: Java, Python, C
- Operating system: macOS, Linux
- Type: Workflow management system
- License: Apache License 2.0
- Website: pegasus.isi.edu

Pegasus is an open-source workflow management system. It provides the necessary abstractions for scientists to create scientific workflows and allows for transparent execution of these workflows on a range of computing platforms including high performance computing clusters, clouds, and national cyberinfrastructure. In Pegasus, workflows are described abstractly as directed acyclic graphs (DAGs) using a provided API for Jupyter Notebooks, Python, R, or Java. During execution, Pegasus translates the constructed abstract workflow into an executable workflow which is executed and managed by HTCondor.

Pegasus is being used in a number of different disciplines including astronomy, gravitational-wave physics, bioinformatics, earthquake engineering, and helioseismology. Notably, the LIGO Scientific Collaboration has used it to directly detect a gravitational wave for the first time.

== Area of applications ==
Application examples:

- Gravitational-Wave Physics
- Earthquake Science
- Bioinformatics
- Workflows for Volcanic Mass Flows
- Diffusion Image Processing and Analysis
- Spallation Neutron Source (SNS)

== History ==
The development of Pegasus started in 2001.

== See also ==
- Distributed computing
- Workflow Management System
