= IsraGrid =

IsraGrid is Israel's national infrastructure for grid and cloud computing. It began operation in January 2009.

A cooperation between Israel's Ministry of Industry, Trade and Employment and the Israeli Science Academy led to the establishment of IsraGrid, operating as a project of the National Infrastructures for R&D Forum (TELEM).

The main objective of IsraGrid is to create an infrastructure for R&D taking advantage of Grid and Cloud Computing. IsraGrid is addressing the needs of all R&D entities, including R&D and IT within enterprises, mature and global Hi-Tech companies and start-ups in different stages with a need for technology ramp-up and a need to reduce capital and operational expenses. IsraGrid intends to provide Grid and Cloud infrastructure for R&D in the Israeli academy and industry, and enlarge the computing resources and their efficient usage by organizations and institutions.
