= HTCondor =

High-throughput computing software

- Developer: University of Wisconsin–Madison
- Stable release: 26.1.0 / November 12, 2026; 6 days ago
- Preview release: 26.0.1 / November 12, 2026; 6 days ago
- Written in: C++, Python, Perl
- Operating system: Microsoft Windows, Mac OS X, Linux, FreeBSD
- Type: High-Throughput Computing
- License: Apache License 2.0
- Website: htcondor.org
- Repository: github.com/htcondor/htcondor

HTCondor is an open-source high-throughput computing software framework for coarse-grained distributed parallelization of computationally intensive tasks. It can be used to manage workload on a dedicated cluster of computers, or to farm out work to idle desktop computers – so-called cycle scavenging. HTCondor runs on Linux, Unix, Mac OS X, FreeBSD, and Microsoft Windows operating systems. HTCondor can integrate both dedicated resources (rack-mounted clusters) and non-dedicated desktop machines (cycle scavenging) into one computing environment.

HTCondor is developed by the HTCondor team at the University of Wisconsin–Madison and is freely available for use. HTCondor follows an open-source philosophy and is licensed under the Apache License 2.0.

While HTCondor makes use of unused computing time, leaving computers turned on for use with HTCondor will increase energy consumption and associated costs. Starting from version 7.1.1, HTCondor can hibernate and wake machines based on user-specified policies, a feature previously available only via third-party software.

== History ==
The development of HTCondor started in 1988.

HTCondor was formerly known as Condor; the name was changed in October 2012 to resolve a trademark lawsuit.

HTCondor was the scheduler software used to distribute jobs for the first draft assembly of the Human Genome.

== Example of use ==
The NASA Advanced Supercomputing facility (NAS) HTCondor pool consists of approximately 350 SGI and Sun workstations purchased and used for software development, visualization, email, document preparation, and other tasks. Each workstation runs a daemon that watches user I/O and CPU load. When a workstation has been idle for two hours, a job from the batch queue is assigned to the workstation and will run until the daemon detects a keystroke, mouse motion, or high non-HTCondor CPU usage. At that point, the job will be removed from the workstation and placed back on the batch queue.

== Features ==
HTCondor can run both sequential and parallel jobs. Sequential jobs can be run in several different "universes", including "vanilla" which provides the ability to run most "batch ready" programs, and "standard universe" in which the target application is re-linked with the HTCondor I/O library which provides for remote job I/O and job checkpointing. HTCondor also provides a "local universe" which allows jobs to run on the "submit host".

In the world of parallel jobs, HTCondor supports the standard Message Passing Interface and Parallel Virtual Machine (Goux, et al. 2000) in addition to its own Master Worker "MW" library for extremely parallel tasks.

HTCondor-G allows HTCondor jobs to use resources not under its direct control. It is mostly used to talk to grid and cloud resources, like pre-WS and WS Globus, Nordugrid ARC, UNICORE and Amazon Elastic Compute Cloud. But it can also be used to talk to other batch systems, like Torque/PBS and LSF. Support for Sun Grid Engine is currently under development as part of the EGEE project.

Other HTCondor features include "DAGMan" which provides a mechanism to describe job dependencies.

== See also ==
- List of volunteer computing projects
- Sun Grid Engine
- IBM Spectrum LSF
- High-throughput computing
