= Péter Kacsuk =

Hungarian computer scientist

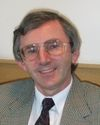
- Kacsuk in 2003
- Scientific career
- Fields: Computer Science, Grid Computing
- Institutions: LPDS at MTA-SZTAKI, Hungary

Péter Kacsuk is a Hungarian computer scientist at MTA-SZTAKI, Budapest, Hungary.

== Biography ==
Péter Kacsuk received his MSc and university doctorate degrees from the Technical University of Budapest, Hungary in 1976 and 1984, respectively. He received the Kandidat degree (equivalent to PhD) from the Hungarian Academy in 1989. He habilitated at the University of Vienna in 1997. He received his professor title from the Hungarian President in 1999 and the Doctor of Academy degree (DSc) from the Hungarian Academy of Sciences in 2001. He is currently the Head of the Laboratory of Parallel and Distributed Systems (LPDS), Computer and Automation Research Institute of the Hungarian Academy of Sciences.

== Research interests ==
- Parallel and distributed systems
- Cluster (computing)
- Grid computing
- Internet computing
- Parallel/distributed programming environments.

== Scientific merits ==
Péter Kacsuk has been a part-time full professor at the Cavendish School of Computer Science of the University of Westminster and the Eötvös Lóránd University of Science since 2001. He served as visiting scientist or professor several times at various universities of Australia, Austria, Canada, England, Germany, Spain, Japan and USA. He has published two books, two lecture notes and more than 200 scientific papers on parallel computer architectures, parallel software engineering and Grid computing.

He was the chair of the "Joint EGEE and SEE-GRID Summer School on Grid Application Support" in 2006 and 2007 and the chair of the "CoreGRID Summer School 2007". He has been involved in many EU Grid projects (EDG, GridLab, EGEE, SEEGRID, CoreGrid, GridCoord, ICEAGE, CancerGrid, etc.). He is the coordinator of the EU FP7 EDGes (Enabling Desktop Grids for e-Science) project. He is co-editor-in-chief of the Journal of Grid Computing published by Springer.

He has received the following awards:

- 2008 MTA SZTAKI award for outstanding management of the Laboratory of Parallel and Distributed Systems
- 2001 MTA SZTAKI award for outstanding scientific performance
- 2000 Kalmár László award of NJSZT (Hungarian Computer Society) for outstanding scientific performance
- 1999 MTA SZTAKI award for outstanding scientific performance
- 1998 MTA SZTAKI AKE award for outstanding scientific and publication activities
- 1998 MTA SZTAKI award for outstanding scientific performance

== Selected publications ==
- Kertész and Kacsuk. 2010: GMBS: A new middleware service for making grids interoperable. In: Future Generation Computer Systems 26:4
- Kacsuk, Lovas, Németh (Eds.). 2008: Distributed and Parallel Systems. In Focus: Desktop Grid Computing. Springer US
- Lovas and Kacsuk. 2007: Correctness debugging of message passing programs using model verification techniques. In: Recent Advances in Parallel Virtual Machine and Message Passing Interface. Proc. of 14th European PVM/MPI User's Group Meeting

== Media appearances ==
Selected media appearances in Hungary, with links to audio/video material:

- 2006.08.03 : Péter Kacsuk in Radio Kossuth (Digitális)
- 2005.11.07 : Péter Kacsuk speaks about the GRID in Duna TV (Heuréka)
- 2000.03.12 : Interview with Péter Kacsuk in Radio Kossuth (Szonda)

== See also ==
- Grid Computing
