= Virtual organization (grid computing) =

In grid computing, a virtual organization (VO) refers to a dynamic set of individuals or institutions defined around a set of resource-sharing rules and conditions. All these virtual organizations share some commonality among them, including common concerns and requirements, but may vary in size, scope, duration, sociology, and structure.

== History ==
The collaborations involved in grid computing of the early 2000s lead to the emergence of multiple organizations that function as one unit through the use of their shared competencies and resources for the purpose of one or more identified goals.

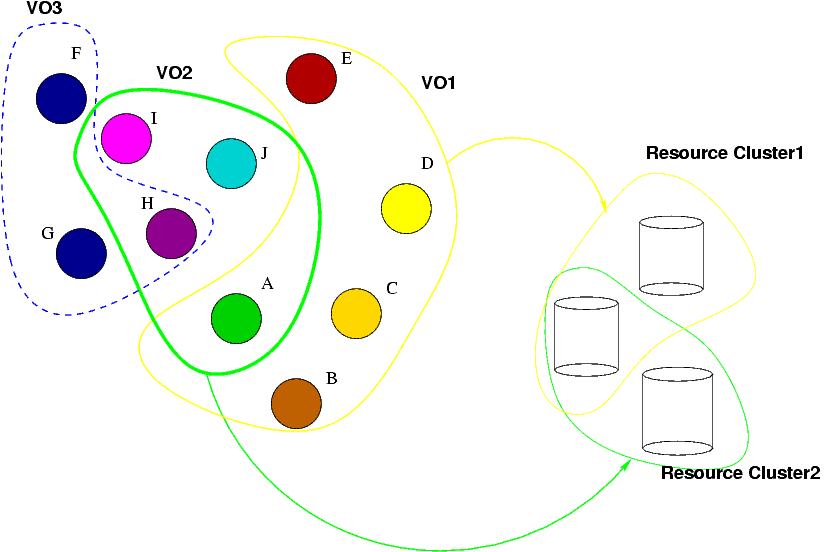
Virtual organization members (A–J) can group together dynamically, to use resources such as a database

A virtual organization has the characteristics of a formal organization while not being one. It comprises a complex network of smaller organizations which each contribute a part of the production process. Boundaries between organizations are fuzzy; control is generally by market forces, reinforced by the certainty of long- term contracts.

The XtreemOS project promised to support virtual organizations.

== See also ==
- List of grid computing projects
- Open Grid Forum
- Cloud computing
