= Sun Cloud =

Discontinued compute platform as a service

Sun Cloud (also known as Network.com) was an on-demand cloud computing service operated by Sun Microsystems prior to Sun's acquisition by Oracle Corporation. The Sun Cloud Compute Utility provided access to a substantial computing resource over the Internet for US$1 per CPU-hour. It was launched as Sun Grid in March 2006—the same month Amazon Web Services began offering their first IT infrastructure services. It was based on and supported open source technologies such as Solaris 10, Sun Grid Engine, and the Java platform.

Sun Cloud delivered enterprise computing power and resources over the Internet, enabling developers, researchers, scientists and businesses to optimize performance, speed time to results, and accelerate innovation without investment in IT infrastructure.

In early 2010 Oracle announced it was discontinuing the Sun Cloud project. Since Sunday, March 7, 2010, the network.com web site has been inaccessible.

== Suitable applications ==
A typical application that could run on the Compute Utility fit the following parameters:

- self-contained
- runs on the Solaris 10 Operating System (OS)
- is implemented with standard object libraries included with the Solaris 10 OS or user libraries packaged with the executable
  - all executable code must be available on the Compute Utility at time of execution
- runs to completion under control of shell scripts (no requirement for interactive access)
- has a total maximum size of applications and data that does not exceed 10 gigabytes
- can be packaged for upload to Sun Cloud as one or more ZIP files of 300 megabytes or smaller

== Resources, jobs, and runs ==
Resources are collections of files that contain the user's data and executable.

A job is a Compute Utility concept that defines the elements of the unit of work that is submitted to the Sun Cloud Compute Utility. The major elements of a job include the name of the shell script controlling program execution, required arguments to the shell script, and a list of resources that must be in place for the job to run.

A run is a specific instantiation of a Job description submitted to the Sun Cloud Compute Utility. Runs occur when the job is submitted to the Compute Utility for execution.

== CPU-hour ==
For each job one submitted and ran on the Cloud, the Sun Cloud CPU usage was aggregated and then rounded up to the nearest whole hour. For example, if a job used 1,000 CPUs for one minute, it would be aggregated as 1,000 CPU minutes, or 16.67 CPU hours, then rounded up to 17 hours; the job would then be billed as US$17.

== Application catalog ==
On March 13, 2007, Sun announced the launch of Application Catalog, an online service that allowed developers and ISVs to develop and publish their applications, enabling communities of scientists and academics in life sciences, education, engineering, and other fields to accelerate innovation and complete research projects quickly and less expensively.

The Network.com Application Catalog gave users immediate online access to popular ISV and open-source applications through an easy-to-use Web portal with no contractual obligation. Users could upload and run their own applications and create a personal library of favorites or take advantage of the pre-installed and configured applications, giving them instant productivity. The portal gave users everything they needed to conduct analysis and complete complex computational tasks to help speed scientific discovery and shorten the time to market for new products. Users would select the application, upload their data, and get results quickly.

Network.com enabled anyone to publish applications to the Application Catalog and take advantage of the Solaris 10-based cloud platform. Users could publish their own applications to a private library and access them whenever they wanted; they could also share their applications with others while retaining their data securely in their private space.

== Available applications ==
Applications available on the Catalog included (by category):

- General - Blender, FDS
- Computer Aided Engineering - Calculix, deal.II, Elmer Solver, Impact, FreeFEM, OFELI
- Life Sciences - BLAST, FASTA, GROMACS, Clustalw, eHITS, T-Coffee, fastDNAml, READSEQ

Examples of types of suitable applications included:

- Bio informatics
- Financial domain applications, like Monte Carlo method, Black–Scholes option pricing models
- Computer Arts, like Fractal landscape generation
- Speech synthesis applications, like Festival
- Scientific applications, like Computer simulation

== See also ==
- Big Buck Bunny - an open content animated film rendered on Sun Cloud
- Utility computing
- Platform as a service
