= CNGrid =

Chinese national high performance computing network

The China National Grid (CNGrid) (Chinese: 中国国家网格) is the Chinese national high performance computing network supported by 863 Program.

== Research and development ==
CNGrid is a project supported by the Hi-Tech Research and Development (863) Program of China. CNGrid is a generation test-bed of information infrastructure aggregating high-performance computing and transaction processing capabilities.

Through resource sharing, work in coordination, and service mechanism, CNGrid supports applications such as scientific research, resource environment, advanced manufacturing, and information services. CNGrid promotes the construction of national information industry and the development of related industries by technological innovations.

China National Grid Software, named CNGrid GOS, is a suite of grid software with independent intellectual property, which is developed by the CNGrid software R&D project team. It mainly includes a system software, a CA certificate management system and a testing environment, three business version of sub-systems (high-performance computing gateway, data grid, and grid workflow), and a monitoring system.

This project is undertaken by seven organizations including Institute of Computing Technology of Chinese Academy of Sciences, Jiangnan Institute of Computing Technology, Tsinghua University, National University of Defense Technology, Beihang University, Computer Network Information Center of Chinese Academy of Sciences, and Shanghai Supercomputing Center.

CNGrid GOS system software

CNGrid GOS system software (VegaGOS) provides functionalities including global naming management, VO management, user management, resource management, application runtime management and so on. The VegaGOS has many important innovations in global naming management, distributed resource management, virtual organization (agora), grid process (grip) technology, grid security mechanism, supporting a variety of domain applications, etc.

Naming

Naming is a decentralized and name-stable global object (Gnode) management system. Naming supports locating objects by the global unique identifier with the feature of low latency and high success ratio; Naming also supports object searching based-on attribute-match with the feature of low latency and high recall ratio. Naming is a fundamental component in VegaGOS to construct the whole system. As a reusable component, Naming forms a global layer of virtual names to solve the problem of non-stable of physical address and tight coupling between applications and resources.

Resource management

Resources in VegaGOS are in various forms, and are accessed in different ways. It is really difficult to describe and manage those heterogeneous resources. The introduction of resource controller mechanism (RController) is in order to import and manage various heterogeneous resources in a unified way. RController provides many functions for resources like create, destroy, access control, access, read and write properties, etc.

VO management

Virtual organization in VegaGOS, called Agora, supplies distributed resources, users and access control policy management, and has the characteristic of single sign-on and single system image. Agora, as a common trusted third-party super-organization, achieves the unified cross-domain access control mechanisms while keeping autonomy.

Grid application runtime management

Grid applications need to maintain the identities of users to support access control implementation during runtime. In VegaGOS, Grid Process technology, which is abbreviated to grip, not only maintains the user identities and other application runtime context, but also manages resources occupied by the application and supports a number of applications collaborations.

Application-level tools

VegaGOS provides application level tools in order to support the traditional command-line mode in high-performance computing and to make it have grid characteristics, including Portal/GShell/VegaSSH/GOSClient. Portal provides users with an operation interface based on the Internet and facilitates users to use VegaGOS. GShell is a grid shell like a GNU bash environment, to support the application running with a grip; VegaSSH supplies single sign-on to any grid node to use the back-end high performance computing resources; GOSClient is a set of client tools including GShell and can be installed independently to use VegaGOS system.

== See also ==
- EUChinaGRID
