= European Open Science Cloud =

- Type of project: research infrastructure
- Owner: European Commission
- Established: 2015
- Website: http://eosc.eu/

The European Open Science Cloud (EOSC) is a European Commission initiative aiming at developing an infrastructure providing its users with services promoting open science practices. Besides being open science oriented, the envisaged infrastructure is built by aggregating services provided by several providers following a System of systems approach. Its goal is to establish a federation of infrastructures facilitating effortless access to interoperable research assets and enhanced services spanning geographical boundaries and diverse academic fields.

The initiative started in 2015 with the plan that its organizers finish it by 2020. A European Union committee on research endorsed a plan for the cloud's development in May 2018. The European Open Science Cloud officially launched in November 2018, starting to provide access to services via their EOSC Portal.

Public meetings about the project have emphasized the ideological motivations for promoting open science.

== EOSC Governance ==
The development of EOSC is governed by three bodies: An executive board tasked to ensure implementation and accountability; a Governance board, working as an institutional group gathering representatives from the Member States and Associated Countries and from the Commission to ensure effective supervision of the EOSC implementation; and a Stakeholder Forum working as the community actively contributing and participating to the EOSC.

== EC funded Projects contributing to EOSC development ==
The EOSC infrastructure is built by leveraging on efforts and services developed and operated by several providers. Moreover, the European Commission specifically funded several projects contributing to the development of EOSC including:

- projects started in 2017
  - EOSCpilot - The European Open Science Cloud for Research Pilot Project (January 2017 - May 2019)
  - eInfraCentral - European E-Infrastructure Services Gateway (January 2017 - 30 June 2019)
- projects started in 2018
  - EOSC-hub - Integrating and managing services for the European Open Science Cloud (January 2018 - December 2020)
  - OpenAIRE-Advance - OpenAIRE Advancing Open Scholarship (January 2018 - December 2020)
  - PaNOSC - Photon and Neutron Open Science Cloud (December 2018 - November 2022)
- projects started in 2019
  - EOSC Enhance - Enhancing the EOSC portal and connecting thematic clouds (December 2019 - November 2021)
  - EOSC-Life - Providing an open collaborative space for digital biology in Europe (March 2019 - February 2023)
  - EOSC-Nordic (September 2019 - August 2022)
  - EOSC-pillar - Coordination and Harmonisation of National Inititiatives, Infrastructures and Data services in Central and Western Europe (July 2019 - June 2022)
  - EOSC-synergy - European Open Science Cloud - Expanding Capacities by building Capabilities (September 2019 - February 2022)
  - EOSCsecretariat.eu (January 2019 - June 2021)
  - ExPaNDS - EOSC Photon and Neutron Data Services (September 2019 - August 2022)
  - FAIRsFAIR - Fostering FAIR Data Practices in Europe (March 2019 - February 2022)
  - NI4OS-Europe - National Initiatives for Open Science in Europe (September 2019 - August 2022)
  - NEANIAS - Novel EOSC services for Emerging Atmosphere, Underwater and Space Challenges (November 2019 - October 2022)
