= E-Infrastructure Reflection Group =

European intergovernmental advisory group

The E-Infrastructure Reflection Group (e-IRG) is a European inter-governmental advisory group dealing with policies on electronic infrastructures (e-Infrastructures) for research, i.e. research networks, computing, software and data infrastructures that mainly serve students, researchers and scientists. It advises and recommends actions towards the European Commission (DG CONNECT), the EU Member states governments (Research or Science Ministries), e-Infrastructure providers and users, as well as other bodies such as ESFRI (European Strategy Forum on Research Infrastructures). On 3 December 2009 EU Competitiveness Council in its conclusions "welcomed the work of the e-IRG to address policy related barriers for the shared use of e-Infrastructures". "A specific role for e-IRG and ESFRI in reinforcing European policy for research infrastructures" was also foreseen in the publication of the European Commission proposal for Horizon 2020 and that the e-IRG and ESFRI will be consulted during the H2020 implementation. Further roles for e-IRG are also included in the European Research Area (ERA) EC Communication, namely to assist in the development of a charter of access for EU research infrastructures, to assist in defining measures that can help to combine national, regional and EU funds and to work with the European Commission to promote the alignment of EU and national approaches to e-Infrastructure development and use.

== Membership ==
The e-IRG is formed by official delegates from ministries of science, research or equivalent from various European countries. The e-IRG also coordinates activities with international initiatives outside of Europe. Consists of appointed EU Member, Accession and Associated States Representatives, and officials from the European Commission. The e-IRG is supported by an e-IRG secretariat located in the Netherlands and a support programme, funded by the European Commission, providing a comprehensive framework assisting the e-IRG work.

== Outputs, meetings and funding ==
The e-IRG produces roadmaps (Roadmap 2016), white papers (e-IRG White Paper 2014), blue papers, workshop reports, task force reports, recommendations, policy papers, and analyses the future foundations of the European Knowledge Society. It supports the creation of a political, technological and administrative framework for an easy and cost-effective shared use of distributed electronic resources across Europe. Particular attention is directed towards networking, computing, software, and data infrastructures. To make this happen e-IRG organizes 2 workshops and 4 delegates meetings every year, hosted by the country holding the presidency of the Council of the European Union. The work of the e-IRG delegates is voluntary.

The e-IRG closely collaborates with ESFRI forum in terms of publishing new strategic documents and organizing events like workshops.

== Executive Board ==
The executive board consists of a chair elected by the members, and three board members representing the rotating EU Presidency (past – current – future presidencies deliver one board member).

The current Executive Board (during Bulgarian EU Presidency 2018):

- Gabriele von Voigt (chair), Leibniz Universität Hannover, Germany
- Aneta Karaivanova (co-chair), Bulgarian Academy of Sciences, Bulgaria
- Toivo Räim (vice-chair), Ministry of Education and Research Republic of Estonia, Estonia
- Paolo Budroni (vice-chair), University of Vienna, Austria
- Jan Wiebelitz (e-IRGSP5), Leibniz Universität Hannover, Germany
