= Distributed European Infrastructure for Supercomputing Applications =

Organization

- Formation: 2002
- Purpose: Research Network
- Region served: Europe

Distributed European Infrastructure for Supercomputing Applications (DEISA) was a consortium of major national supercomputing centres in Europe. Initiated in 2002, it became a European Union funded supercomputer project. The consortium of eleven national supercomputing centres from seven European countries promoted pan-European research on European high-performance computing systems by creating a European collaborative environment in the area of supercomputing.

== History ==
The DEISA project started as DEISA1 in 2002 developing and supporting a pan-European distributed high performance computing infrastructure. The initial project was funded by the European Commission in the sixth of the Framework Programmes for Research and Technological Development (FP6) from 2004 through 2008. The funding continued for the follow-up project DEISA2 in the Seventh Framework Programme (FP7) through 2011.

The DEISA infrastructure coupled eleven national supercomputing centres with a dedicated (mostly 10 Gbit/s) network connection provided by GÉANT2 on the European level and the national research and education networks (NRENs).

DEISA was the first initiative to overcome the fragmentation of supercomputing resources in Europe. Parts of the national supercomputing resources were provided for most challenging computational projects from all over Europe, providing access to the most advanced and most suitable supercomputer architectures available, for positively reviewed projects. Through DECI, the DEISA Extreme Computing Initiative, not only computing resources, but also advanced application enabling was provided.

== Consortium ==
There were 11 principal partners and four associate partners.

Principal partners were:

- Max Planck Gesellschaft, Germany
- Bavarian Academy of Sciences and Humanities, Germany
- Barcelona Supercomputing Center, Spain
- CINECA, Italy
- CSC, Scientific Computing Ltd, Finland
- European Centre for Medium-Range Weather Forecasts, United Kingdom
- Jülich Research Centre, Germany
- Institut du Développement et des Ressources en Informatique Scientifique (CNRS), France
- Stichting Academisch Rekencentrum Amsterdam, Netherlands
- Edinburgh Parallel Computing Centre, United Kingdom
- High Performance Computing Center Stuttgart (HLRS), University of Stuttgart, Germany

Associate partners were:

- CEA, Computing Complex, Bruyères-le-Châtel, France
- JSCC, Joint Supercomputer Center of the Russian Academy of Sciences, Moscow
- Swiss National Supercomputing Centre (CSCS), Manno, Switzerland
- The Royal Institute of Technologies - Center for Parallel Computers, (KTH), Stockholm, Sweden

In 2011 services were taken over by the Partnership for Advanced Computing in Europe (PRACE).

== DEISA Extreme Computing Initiative - DECI ==
The DEISA Extreme Computing Initiative (DECI) was launched in 2005 to enhance DEISA's impact on science and technology in Europe. DEISA carried out 6 DECI projects until 2010. After the end of DEISA, DECI was continued by PRACE as Tier-1 level services under the name of "Distributed European Computing Initiative", while the new PRACE Tier-0 level services became the leading edge of supercomputing in Europe.

== The DEISA TeraGrid Collaboration ==
DEISA was the European counterpart of the US NSF funded TeraGrid project. In a collaborative effort in 2005, a dedicated trusted network connection was established between DEISA and TeraGrid, to implement a combined global file system spanning two continents. During the Supercomputing Conference 2005, supercomputing applications were carried out both in Europe and in the US with output transparently written to the unified global file system. For details see "Exploring the hyper-grid idea with grand challenge applications: the DEISA-TeraGrid interoperability demonstration".

== DEISA Publications ==
DEISA published a brochure in 2008 and DEISA Digests in 2008, 2010 and 2011.

DEISA Brochure: Advancing Science in Europe (ISBN 978-952-5520-32-3)

DEISA Digest 2008: Benefits of Supercomputing (ISBN 978-952-5520-33-0)

DEISA Digest 2010: Extreme computing in Europe (ISBN 978-952-5520-40-8)

DEISA Digest 2011: Extreme computing in Europe (ISBN 978-952-5520-40-8)

== DEISA Benchmark Suite ==
DEISA produced a benchmark suite to help computer scientists assess the performance of parallel supercomputer systems. The benchmark comprises a number of real applications codes taken from a wide range of scientific disciplines. A structured framework allows compilation, execution and analysis to be configured and carried out via standard input files.

The codes were chosen as representative of the scientific projects performed on the DEISA supercomputers. The codes and associated datasets were selected for benchmarking systems with peak performances ranging up to hundreds of teraflops, machines which are more powerful than a desktop personal computer by factors of tens of thousands.

The suite contained codes relevant to astrophysics, fluid dynamics, climate modelling, biosciences, materials science, fusion power and fundamental particle physics. It has been run by DEISA on a range of its own supercomputers and records of the results are kept for comparison. The DEISA benchmark was used by the EU-funded PRACE project as a starting point for their investigations of benchmarks for the next generation of petaflop supercomputers.
