= European Grid Infrastructure =

Effort to provide access to high-throughput computing resources across Europe

EGI
- Type: Scientific support
- Industry: Internet; Cloud computing; e-infrastructure; service federation
- Founded: 2010
- Headquarters: Science Park 140 1098 XG, Amsterdam, The Netherlands
- Area served: Europe
- Key people: Tiziana Ferrari (Director)
- Revenue: 6,130,989 euro (2023)
- Website: egi.eu

EGI (originally an initialism for European Grid Infrastructure) is a federation of computing and storage resource providers that deliver advanced computing and data analytics services for research and innovation. The Federation is governed by its participants represented in the EGI Council and coordinated by the EGI Foundation.

As of 2024, the EGI Federation supports 160 scientific communities worldwide and over 95,000 users in their intensive data analysis. The most significant scientific communities supported by EGI in 2022 were Medical and Health Sciences, High Energy Physics, and Engineering and Technology. The EGI Federation provides services through over 150 data centres, of which 25 are cloud sites, in 43 countries and 64 Research Infrastructures (4 of which are members of the Federation).

== Name ==
Originally, EGI stood for European Grid Infrastructure. This reflected its focus on providing access to high-throughput computing resources across Europe using Grid computing techniques. However, as EGI's service offerings expanded beyond traditional grid computing, particularly with the incorporation of federated cloud services, the original meaning of the acronym became less accurate.

== Structure ==
=== EGI Federation ===
The EGI Federation delivers a scalable digital research infrastructure (e-infrastructure), empowering tens of thousands of researchers across diverse scientific disciplines. Through the EGI Federation, researchers gain access to advanced computing and data analytics capabilities, including large-scale data analysis, while benefiting from the collaborative efforts of hundreds of service providers from both public and private sectors, consolidating resources from Europe and beyond. Overall, the EGI Federation offers a range of services, encompassing distributed high-throughput computing and cloud computing, storage and data management capabilities, co-development of new solutions, expert support, and comprehensive training opportunities. This ecosystem aims to propel collaboration, scientific progress and innovation.

=== EGI Foundation ===
The EGI Foundation is the coordinating body of the EGI Federation. It was established in 2010 with headquarters in Amsterdam, Netherlands. The Foundation coordinates the research and innovation efforts of its members, spanning technical areas critical to data-intensive science, including large-scale data processing and analysis, distributed Artificial Intelligence/Machine Learning, federated Identity and access management and the application of digital twins for research. The day-to-day running of the EGI Foundation is supervised by the Executive Board. The board’s members work closely with the EGI Director on operational, technical and financial issues. The Executive Board’s members are appointed by the EGI Council for a two-year term.

=== EGI Council ===
The EGI Council is responsible for defining the strategic direction of the EGI Federation. The Council acts as the senior decision-making and supervisory authority of the EGI Foundation, with a mandate to define the strategic direction of the entire EGI ecosystem.

=== EGI Services ===
EGI offers a suite of services to support data-intensive research. These services include compute resources, orchestration tools, storage and data management solutions, training programmes, security and identity services, and applications. Compute resources encompass cloud compute, cloud container compute, high-throughput compute, and software distribution. Orchestration tools include the Workload Manager and infrastructure manager. Storage and data management solutions include online storage, data transfer, and DataHub. Training programmes cover FitSM, ISO 27001, and general training infrastructure. EGI Check-in and Secrets Store are key security and identity services, while applications such as Notebooks and Replay enhance research productivity. In addition to services for Research, EGI also provides services for Federation and Business. Services for Federation are designed to help resource providers and user communities collaborate and share resources. EGI also offers a range of services to support businesses in their digital transformation. Through the EGI Digital Innovation Hub (EGI DIH), companies can access advanced computing resources, networking, funding and training opportunities, collaborate with research institutions, and test solutions before investing.

== History ==
In 2002, the first large-scale experimental facility was successfully demonstrated by the DataGrid project under the lead of CERN with tens of technical architects from the major High Energy Physics institutes in the world. For the first time, distributed computing was applied to data-intensive processing. It aimed at developing a large-scale computational grid to facilitate distributed data-intensive scientific computing across High Energy Physics, Earth Observation, and Biology science applications.

On 28 February 2003, the first software release of LCG-MW was published. gLite, the Lightweight Middleware for Grid Computing and LCG, Large Hadron Collider Computing Grid, are the cornerstone of the Worldwide LHC Computing Grid, which expanded over time towards the EGI Federation.

2004 marks the year of the first pilot infrastructure, seeing the participation of CERN and data centres in the United Kingdom, Spain, Germany, the Netherlands, France, Canada, Russia, Bulgaria, the Asia-Pacific region and Switzerland. Over the years, the infrastructure has grown into a federation of 128 data centres and 25 cloud providers serving more than 95,000 users worldwide. In 2004, the first data processing tasks started being formally recorded in a central accounting system. The EGI Accounting Portal provides the accounting data for Compute, Storage and Data services gathered from the data centres of the EGI Federation.

A few years later, in 2010, EGI was established as the coordinating body of the EGI Federation to build an integrated pan-European infrastructure to support European research communities primarily. In the same year, EGI launched the flagship project EGI Inspire. That project brought together European organisations to establish a sustainable European Grid Infrastructure for large-scale data analysis. The success of the project was due to the adoption of a distributed computing model to solve big data problems. Moreover, EGI-Inspire harmonised operational policies across its federation of affiliated data centres and cloud service providers worldwide, integrating e-infrastructures from 57 countries. The EGI Federation was the first to apply federation to cloud provisioning, opening a new avenue in large-scale interactive data analysis. In 2015, within EGI Engage, opening a new avenue in large-scale interactive data analysis. The EGI Federated Cloud is an IaaS-type cloud, incorporating academic and private clouds and virtualised resources built using open standards. Its development is driven by the needs of the scientific community, resulting in a novel research e-infrastructure that relies on well-established federated operational services, making EGI a dependable resource for scientific endeavours. In 2015, EGI, EUDAT, GÉANT, LIBER and OpenAIRE published a position paper on a 'European Open Science Cloud for Research'. With the EOSC-hub project in 2016, EGI started contributing in practice to shaping the services for the EOSC. The work continued with a series of projects, like EOSC Enhance, EOSC Life and EOSC Synergy. With EGI-ACE and its contribution to EOSC Future, EGI has continued developing the EOSC Core. In early 2024, EGI started providing services to the EOSC EU Node, and with EOSC Beyond it will provide new EOSC Core capabilities and pilot additional national and thematic nodes. In October 2024, EUDAT, GÉANT, OpenAIRE, PRACE and EGI signed a Memorandum of Understanding establishing the European e-Infrastructures Assembly. This collaboration will bolster the position and promote the services of e-Infrastructures, empowering researchers across Europe to drive innovation and advance scientific discovery.

== See also ==
- European Open Science Cloud
- E-Infrastructure Reflection Group
- Supercomputing in Europe
- eScience
- GridPP (UK NGI)
