= List of job scheduler software =

This is a list of notable job scheduler software. Job scheduling applications are designed to carry out repetitive tasks as defined in a schedule based upon calendar and event conditions. This category of software is also called workload automation. Only products with their own article are listed:

- Absyss / Visual TOM / VTOM
- ActiveBatch
- Apache Airflow
- Booksy
- Cron
- DIET
- HTCondor
- JobRunr
- Maui Cluster Scheduler
- OpenLava
- OpenPBS
- Oracle Grid Engine
- Platform LSF
- ProActive
- Quartz
- Slurm Workload Manager
- Systemd
- Univa Grid Engine
- VisualCron
- Windows Task Scheduler
