= Platform Computing =

Software company in Canada

- Type: Private
- Industry: Cloud computing, High performance computing, Distributed computing, Grid computing, Computer software
- Founded: Toronto, Ontario, Canada (1992)
- Fate: Acquired by IBM
- Headquarters: Markham, Ontario, Canada
- Key people: Leadership team
- Products: Platform ISF, Platform LSF, Platform Symphony, Platform Cluster Manager, Platform Manager, Platform MPI
- Revenue: ▲$71.6 million USD (2010)
- Number of employees: 530
- Website: www.platform.com

Platform Computing was a privately held software company primarily known for its job scheduling product, Load Sharing Facility (LSF). It was founded in 1992 in Toronto, Ontario, Canada and headquartered in Markham, Ontario with 11 branch offices across the United States, Europe and Asia.

In January 2012, Platform Computing was acquired by IBM.

== History ==
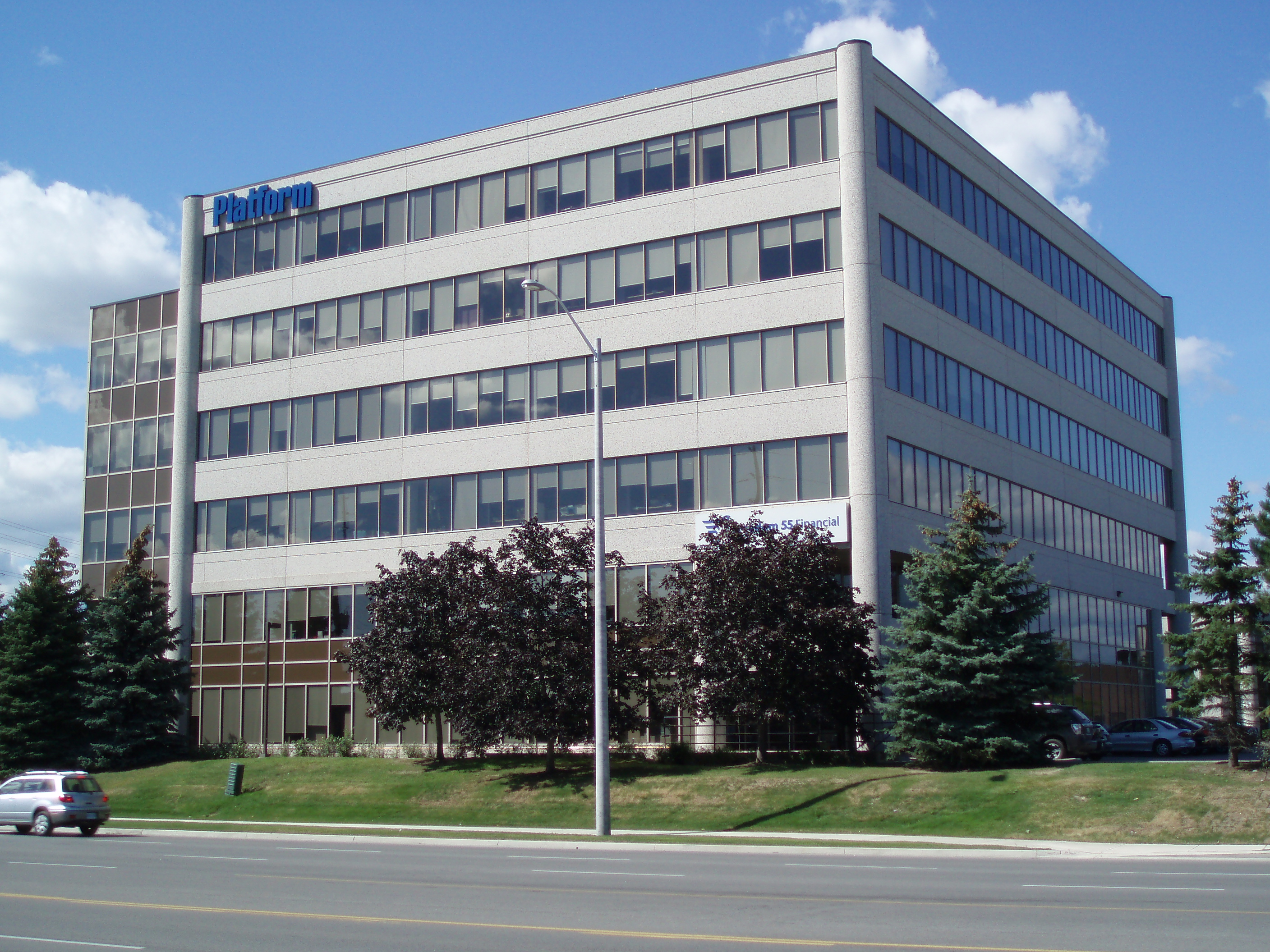
Platform Headquarters in Canada.

Platform Computing was founded by Songnian Zhou, Jingwen Wang, and Bing Wu in 1992. Its first product, LSF, was based on the Utopia research project at the University of Toronto. The LSF software was developed partially with funding from CANARIE (Canadian Advanced Network and Research for Industry and Education).

Platform's revenue was approximately $300,000 in 1993, and reached $12 million in 1997. Revenue grew by 34% (YoY) to US$46.2 million in 2001, US$50 million in 2003.

In 1999, the SiteAssure suite was announced by Platform to address website availability and monitoring market.

On October 29, 2007, Platform Computing acquired the Scali Manage business from Norway-based Scali AS. Scali was cluster management software. On August 1, 2008, Platform acquired the rest of the Scali business, taking on the industry-standard Message Passing Interface (MPI), Scali MPI, and rebranding it Platform MPI.

On June 22, 2009, Platform Computing announced its first software to serve the cloud computing space. Platform ISF (Infrastructure Sharing Facility) enables organizations to set up and manage private clouds, controlling both physical and virtual resources.

In August 2009, Platform acquired HP-MPI from Hewlett-Packard.

In January 2012, Platform Computing was acquired by IBM.

== Open-source participation ==
- Platform joined the Hadoop project in 2011, and is focused on enhancing the Hadoop Distributed File System
- Platform Lava - based on Platform LSF, licensed under GPLv2. The Lava scheduler is part of Red Hat HPC. Discontinued in 2011.
- OpenLava - successor to Platform Lava.
- Platform FTA - File Transfer Agent for HPC clusters
- Nagios Plug-ins
- Community Scheduler Framework - a meta-scheduling framework

== Memberships ==
Platform Computing is a member of the following organizations:

- The Green Grid
- Open Grid Forum

== Standards ==
Platform products adopted the following standards:

- DRMAA
- Intel Cluster Ready
- HPC Profile
- JSDL
- Open MPI
- Project Kusu, the basis for the Platform Cluster Manager

== See also ==
- Computational grid
- CPU scavenging
- Beowulf (computing)
- Job schedulers
