= Kentucky Linux Athlon Testbed =

The Kentucky Linux Athlon Testbed (KLAT2) is a 64+2 node Beowulf cluster built by the University of Kentucky College of Engineering in 2000. The cluster used entirely off the shelf components.

== See also ==
- Open Source Cluster Application Resources
- TORQUE Resource Manager
- Maui Cluster Scheduler
