= GridWay =

GridWay Metascheduler
- Developer(s): DSA Research Group, UCM
- Stable release: 5.14 / April 1, 2013
- Operating system: UNIX-like
- Platform: any
- Type: Grid computing
- License: Apache license, Version 2.0
- Website: http://gridway.ucm.es/

GridWay is an open-source meta-scheduling technology that enables large-scale, secure, reliable and efficient sharing of computing resources (clusters, computing farms, servers, supercomputers...), managed by different distributed resource management systems (DRMS), such as SGE, HTCondor, PBS or LSF, within a single organization (enterprise grid) or scattered across several administrative domains (partner or supply-chain grid). To this end, GridWay supports several Grid middlewares.

== Functionality ==
GridWay provides end users and application developers with a scheduling framework similar to that found on local DRMS, allowing to submit, monitor, synchronize and control jobs by means of a DRMS-like command line interface (gwsubmit, gwwait, gwkill...) and DRMAA (an OGF standard).

GridWay performs job execution management and resource brokering, allowing unattended, reliable, and efficient execution of jobs, array jobs, or complex jobs on heterogeneous, dynamic and loosely coupled Grids. GridWay performs all the job scheduling and submission steps transparently to the end user and adapts job execution to changing Grid conditions by providing fault recovery mechanisms, dynamic scheduling, migration on-request and opportunistic migration. The GridWay framework is a light component for meta-scheduling in the Grid Ecosystem intended for end users and grid application developers.

== See also ==
- Globus Toolkit
- HTCondor
- Open Grid Forum
- DRMAA
