= Job Submission Description Language =

Job Submission Description Language is an extensible XML specification from the Global Grid Forum for the description of simple tasks to non-interactive computer execution systems. Currently at version 1.0 (released November 7, 2005), the specification focuses on the description of computational task submissions to traditional high-performance computer systems like batch schedulers.

== Description ==
JSDL describes the submission aspects of a job, and does not attempt to describe the state of running or historic jobs. Instead, JSDL includes descriptions of:

- Job name, description
- Resource requirements that computers must have to be eligible for scheduling, such as total RAM available, total swap available, CPU clock speed, number of CPUs, and operating system.
- Execution limits, such as the maximum amount of CPU time, wallclock time, or memory that can be consumed.
- File staging, or the transferring of files before or after execution.
- Command to execute, including its command-line arguments, environment variables to define, stdin/stdout/stderr redirection, etc.

== Software support ==
The following software is known to currently support JSDL:

- GridWay meta scheduler
- Platform LSF 7
- UNICORE 6
- GridSAM
- Windows HPC Server 2008
- GRIA
- Genesis II Project http://genesis2.virginia.edu/wiki/
- Advanced Resource Connector (ARC v0.6 and above)
- XtreemOS Grid Operating System
- EMOTIVE Cloud
- IBM Tivoli Workload Scheduler Tivoli Workload Scheduler

== See also ==
- Resource Specification Language (See The Globus Resource Specification Language RSL v1.0)
- Distributed Resource Management Application API
