= Qsub =

qsub is an IEEE Std 1003.1-2008 Unix command for submitting jobs to a job scheduler, usually in cluster or grid computing. The qsub command is used to submit jobs to Portable Batch System, TORQUE, and Oracle Grid Engine. In HTCondor, qsub is called condor_qsub. Its equivalent in Slurm is sbatch.
