= Fractal component model =

Fractal is a modular and extensible component model that can be used with various programming languages to design, implement, deploy and reconfigure various systems and applications, from operating systems to middleware platforms and to graphical user interfaces. The goal of Fractal is to reduce the development, deployment and maintenance costs of software systems in general, and of OW2 projects in particular. The Fractal model already uses some well known design patterns, such as separation of interface and implementation and, more generally, separation of concerns, in order to achieve this goal. There is also ongoing research work to get even closer to this goal. Fractal is hosted and developed by the OW2 consortium. It is distributed under the LGPL open-source license.

== Sub Projects ==
The Fractal Project is made of four sub projects:

- The Component Model sub project deals with the definition of the Fractal component model specification. The main characteristics of this model are recursivity (components can be nested in composite components - hence the "Fractal" name) and reflexivity (components have full introspection and intercession capabilities). The Fractal model is also language independent, and fully modular and extensible.
- The Implementations sub project deals with the implementation of Fractal component platforms, which allow the creation, configuration and reconfiguration of Fractal components. Julia, the reference implementation, is developed in this sub project.
- The Component Libraries sub project deals with the implementation of reusable, ready to use Fractal components, such as protocol or Swing components.
- The Tools sub project deals with the implementation of Fractal-based applications dedicated to Fractal, such as tools to define and manage component configurations .

== Implementations ==
Besides Julia, the reference implementation in Java maintained in the ObjectWeb Fractal project, there are several other implementations of the Fractal component model in other projects, including non ObjectWeb projects:

- AOKell is a Java implementation similar to Julia, but based on AspectJ instead of mixins. It can execute the same applications as Julia, including Fractal RMI, Fractal ADL, Fractal Explorer.
- FracTalk is a SmallTalk implementation of the Fractal component model.
- FractNet is a .Net implementation of the Fractal component model.
- Plasma is a C++ implementation of Fractal, geared at multimedia applications.
- ProActive is a distributed and asynchronous implementation of Fractal geared at Grid Computing.
- Think is a C implementation of Fractal geared at operating system development.
- Cecilia is another C implementation of Fractal, forked from Think v3.

== Tools ==
The currently available Fractal tools are listed below:

- Fractal ADL parser is a tool made of several Fractal components that can describe and parse Fractal ADL architecture definitions, and instantiate the corresponding components.
- Fractal GUI editor is a tool made of several Fractal components that provides a graphical tool to design and edit Fractal component configurations.
- Fractal Explorer console is a tool that provides a way for reconfiguring and managing Fractal-based applications at runtime.
- Fraclet provides an annotation-based programming model to leverage the development of Fractal components.
