= Dcache =

dcache may refer to:

- the directory name lookup cache in Linux
- the dCache project
