= NorduGrid =

Grid computing project

- Formation: February 1, 2001; 25 years ago
- Legal status: collaboration
- Purpose: software development
- Headquarters: Oslo
- Location: international
- Members: research groups and projects
- Official language: En
- Chairman of the Board: Prof. Farid Ould-Saada
- Main organ: Consortium Board
- Website: www.nordugrid.org

NorduGrid is a collaboration aiming at development, maintenance and support of the free Grid middleware, known as the Advanced Resource Connector (ARC).

== History ==
The name NorduGrid first became known in 2001 as short for the project called "Nordic Testbed for Wide Area Computing and Data Handling" funded by the Nordic Council of Ministers via the Nordunet2 programme. That project's main goal was to set up a prototype of a distributed computing infrastructure (a testbed), aiming primarily at the needs of the High Energy Physics researchers in the ATLAS experiment.

Following evaluation of the then existing Grid technology solutions, NorduGrid developers came up with an alternative software architecture. It was implemented and demonstrated in May 2002, and soon became known as the NorduGrid Middleware. In 2004 this middleware solution was given a proper name, the Advanced Resource Connector (ARC).

Until May 2003, NorduGrid headquarters were in the Niels Bohr Institute; at the 5th NorduGrid Workshop it was decided to move them to the Oslo University. The present-day formal collaboration was established in 2005 by five Nordic academic institutes (Niels Bohr Institute in Copenhagen, Denmark, Helsinki Institute of Physics in Finland, Oslo University in Norway, and Lund and Uppsala Universities in Sweden) with the goal to develop, support, maintain and popularize ARC. Deployment and support of the Nordic Grid infrastructure itself became the responsibility of the NDGF project, launched in June 2006. This marked clear separation between Grid middleware providers and infrastructure services providers. To further support ARC development, NorduGrid and several other interested partners secured dedicated funding through EU FP6 project KnowARC.

NorduGrid Collaboration is based upon a non-binding Memorandum of Understanding and is open for new members.

== Goals ==
The NorduGrid Collaboration is the consortium behind the ARC middleware, and its key goal is to ensure that ARC is further developed, maintained, supported and widely deployed, while remaining a free open-source software, suitable for a wide variety of high-throughput Grid computational tasks.

The ultimate goal is to provide a reliable, scalable, portable and full-featured solution for Grid infrastructures, conformant with open standards, primarily those developed in the framework of the Open Grid Forum.

While ARC software development may and does often take place outside NorduGrid, the Collaboration coordinates contributions to the code and maintains the code and software repositories, as well as a build system, an issue tracking system and other necessary software development services.

NorduGrid defines strategical directions for development of ARC and ensures financial support for it.

== ARC Community ==
The term "ARC Community" is used to refer to various groups of people willing to share their computational resources via ARC. A tit-for-tat user group is formalized as a virtual organisation (VO), allowing the mutual use of such community resources.

Contrary to the popular belief, NorduGrid members are not required to provide computing or storage resources; neither offering such resources grants an automatic membership.

Still, ARC community as a whole owns a substantial amount of computing and storage resources. On a voluntarily basis, and for the purpose of the open-source development process, community members may donate CPU cycles and some storage space to the developers and testers. Such resources constitute the testbed for the ARC middleware.

Other than such donated community resources, NorduGrid does not provide or allocate any computational resources and does not coordinate worldwide deployment of ARC.

Actual deployment and usage of ARC-based distributed computing infrastructures is coordinated by the respective infrastructure projects, such as e.g. NeIC.

Apart from contributing computational resources, many groups develop higher-level software tools on top of ARC (e.g.).

== NorduGrid Certification Authority ==
NorduGrid Certification Authority (CA) is currently the only major infrastructure service provided by the NorduGrid. This Authority issues electronic certificates to users and services, such that they can work in Grid environments. Present day Grid implementations require X.509 certificates to validate identity of Grid participants. NorduGrid CA provides such certificates to individuals and machines associated with research and/or academic institutions in Denmark, Finland, Norway and Sweden. The NorduGrid Certification Authority is a member of the European Policy Management Authority for Grid Authentication (EUGridPMA).

== See also ==
- Advanced Resource Connector
- KnowARC
- Nordic Data Grid Facility
- Enabling Grids for E-sciencE
- European Grid Initiative
- European Middleware Initiative
- Open Science Grid
- UNICORE
- Open Grid Forum
