= Donald Becker =

American software developer

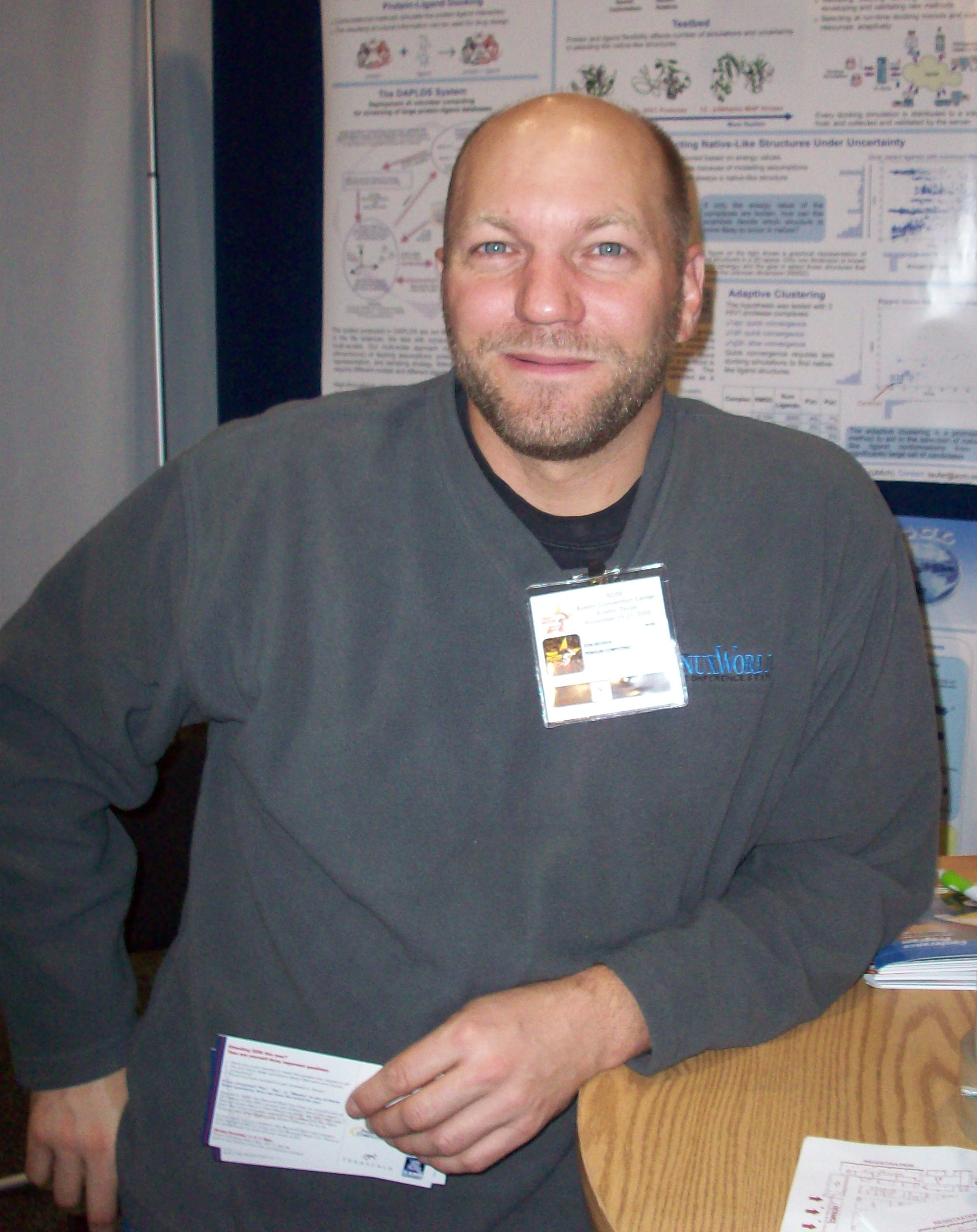
- Occupation: Computer programmer
- Employer(s): NASA (former); Scyld Computer Corporation (Penguin Computing)
- Known for: Linux Ethernet drivers; co-creating Beowulf clustering software with Thomas Sterling
- Title: Chief Technology Officer, Scyld Computer Corporation
- Awards: Gordon Bell Prize (1997)

Donald Becker is an American computer programmer who wrote Ethernet drivers for the Linux operating system.

Becker, in collaboration with Thomas Sterling, created the Beowulf clustering software while at NASA, to connect many inexpensive PCs to solve complex math problems typically reserved for classic supercomputers. For this work, Becker received the Gordon Bell Prize in 1997.

Becker became the Chief Technology Officer (CTO) of Scyld Computer Corporation, a wholly owned subsidiary of Penguin Computing, a developer and supplier of Beowulf clusters.
