= Catlett =

Catlett may refer to:

- Catlett (surname), including a list of people with the name
- Catlett, Virginia, a place in the United States
