= Open Grid Services Architecture =

Open Grid Services Architecture (OGSA) describes a service-oriented architecture for a grid computing environment for business and scientific use. It was developed within the Open Grid Forum, which was called the Global Grid Forum (GGF) at the time, around 2002 to 2006.

== Description ==
OGSA is a distributed interaction and computing architecture based around services, assuring interoperability on heterogeneous systems so that different types of resources can communicate and share information. OGSA is based on several other Web service technologies, such as the Web Services Description Language (WSDL) and the Simple Object Access Protocol (SOAP), but it aims to be largely independent of transport-level handling of data. OGSA has been described as a refinement of a Web services architecture, specifically designed to support grid requirements. The concept of OGSA is derived from work presented in the 2002 Globus Alliance paper "The Physiology of the Grid" by Ian Foster, Carl Kesselman, Jeffrey M. Nick, and Steven Tuecke. It was developed by GGF working groups which resulted in a document, entitled The Open Grid Services Architecture, Version 1.5 in 2006. The GGF published some use case scenarios.

According to the "Defining the Grid: A Roadmap for OGSA Standards v 1.0", OGSA is:

- An architectural process in which the GGF's OGSA Working Group collects requirements and maintains a set of informational documents that describe the architecture;
- A set of normative specifications and profiles that document the precise requirements for a conforming hardware or software component;
- Software components that adhere to the OGSA specifications and profiles, enabling deployment of grid solutions that are interoperable even though they may be based on implementations from multiple sources.

The Open Grid Services Architecture, Version 1.5 described these capabilities:

- Infrastructure services
- Execution Management services
- Data services
- Resource Management services
- Security services
- Self-management services
- Information services

In late 2006 an updated version of OGSA and several associated documents were published, including the first of several planned normative documents, "Open Grid Services Architecture Glossary of Terms, Version 1.5".

The Open Grid Services Infrastructure (OGSI) is related to OGSA, as it was originally intended to form the basic “plumbing” layer for OGSA. It was superseded by Web Services Resource Framework (WSRF) and WS-Management.
