= Nordic Data Grid Facility =

Grid computing infrastructure

The Nordic Data Grid Facility, or NDGF, is a common e-Science infrastructure provided by the Nordic countries (Denmark, Finland, Norway, Sweden and Iceland) for scientific computing and data storage. It is the first and so far only internationally distributed WLCG Tier1 center, providing computing and storage services to experiments at CERN.

== History ==
Nordic Data Grid Facility traces its history back to end-2001, being intrinsically related to the NorduGrid project. Success of the latter indicated need for a larger pan-Nordic facility, with storage resources being of high priority. This need has been addressed by establishing a pilot NDGF infrastructure, which was operational in 2002-2005, and provided distributed storage in addition to the NorduGrid computing resources. During this phase, NDGF committed to provide a Nordic Tier1 (regional computing center) for the Worldwide LHC Computing Grid project at CERN. Specifics of this Tier1 are such that it has to be an internationally distributed Facility. The Nordic Data Grid Facility in its present function as a provider of the Nordic Grid Infrastructure was established in April 2006 by the Nordic Research Councils. It came into operation on June 1, 2006, and its initial priority is to live up to the original commitment of establishing the Nordic Tier1, with the traditional focus on storage facilities. NDGF team includes software experts who take part in various Grid middleware development.

In 2012 NDGF became a part of a wider initiative, the Nordic e-Infrastructure Collaboration.

== Users and operations ==
NDGF Tier1 is a production Grid facility that leverages existing, national computational resources and Grid infrastructures.

To qualify for support research groups should form a Virtual Organization, a VO. The VO provides compute resources for sharing and NDGF Tier1 operates a Grid interface for the sharing of these resources.

Currently, most computational resources of NDGF Tier1 are accessible through ARC middleware. Some resources are also available via AliEn software. Distributed storage facility is realised through dCache storage management solution.

Today, the dominant user community of the NDGF Tier1 is the High Energy Physics - the ALICE, ATLAS and CMS Virtual Organizations - through the operation of the Nordic Tier1, which together with the Tier0, CERN, and the other 12 Tier1s collects, stores and processes the data produced by the Large Hadron Collider at CERN.

Since 2010, NDGF Tier1 is a part of the European Grid Infrastructure.

NDGF Tier1 was hosted by NORDUnet in 2006-2011, and since 2012 is hosted by NordForsk.

== NDGF vs NorduGrid ==
Many confuse NDGF and NorduGrid - which is not surprising, especially since in its second phase NDGF was proposed to assume the name "NorduGrid". It was however decided to distinguish between the mostly development-oriented project, NorduGrid, and the mostly operations-oriented one, NDGF. As a rule of thumb, NDGF provides mostly services, while NorduGrid provides mostly ARC middleware.

== See also ==
- NeIC, the organisation operating NDGF Tier-1 since 2012
- NorduGrid collaboration, provider of the ARC middleware
- NORDUnet, the NDGF hosting organisation in 2006-2011
