= OpenLava =

- Final release: 4.0 DMCA
- Written in: C
- Operating system: Linux
- Platform: Linux_x86_64
- Size: 1.53MB(.tar File)
- Type: Job Scheduler for Compute Cluster
- License: GNU General Public License (OpenLava 3.0, 3.1, 3.2, 3.3, and 4.0 included confidential and proprietary source code from IBM Spectrum LSF)

OpenLava is a workload job scheduler for a cluster of computers. OpenLava was based from the last revision of Platform Lava, which was discontinued in 2011. Its configuration file syntax, application program interface (API), and command-line interface (CLI) have been kept unchanged. Therefore, OpenLava is mostly compatible with Platform LSF.

OpenLava was based on an early version of LSF, which itself was based on the Utopia research project at the University of Toronto.

== History ==
In 2007, Platform Computing and Red Hat (both are now part of IBM) jointly offered the Red Hat HPC Solution, which integrates Red Hat Enterprise Linux with Platform's Open Cluster Stack (OCS). As the core of Platform OCS, Platform released Platform Lava 1.0, which is a simplified version of Platform LSF 4.2 code, licensed under GNU General Public License v2. Platform subsequently marketed OCS with Dell, Arrow Electronics, and Intel's Intel Cluster Ready.

Platform Lava had no additional releases after v1.0 and was discontinued in 2011. In June 2011, OpenLava 1.0 code was committed to GitHub.

=== Commercial support ===
In 2014, a number of former Platform Computing employees founded Teraproc Inc., which contributed development and provided commercial support for OpenLava. Commercially supported OpenLava contains add-on features than the community based OpenLava project.

=== IBM Lawsuit ===
In October 2016, IBM filed a lawsuit alleging copyright infringement and trade secrets misappropriation against Teraproc. The complaint accused some of the company's founders of taking “confidential and proprietary source code" for IBM's Spectrum LSF product when they left, which was then used as the basis of the competitive product OpenLava. David Bigagli, the TeraProc employee who started the OpenLava project, posted a notice on GitHub announcing that downloads for OpenLava had been disabled because of a DMCA takedown notice sent by IBM's lawyers.

Bigagli later announced that the source code for OpenLava 3.0 and 4.0 would be taken down, while the source code of 2.2 would be restored in order to regain the GitHub repository and the openlava.org website, while claiming that the DMCA claim is fraudulent.

On September 18, 2018, the US Courts found in favor of IBM and issued a permanent injunction against Teraproc and its agents.

=== Post lawsuit ===
A number of forks derived from the OpenLava 2.0 codebase, which is not alleged in the IBM lawsuit, emerged after the lawsuit.

== See also ==
- List of free and open-source software packages
- IBM Spectrum LSF
- GNU Queue
