= CDDLM =

Grid computing standard

CDDLM (Configuration Description, Deployment, and Lifecycle Management Specification) is a Global Grid Forum standard for the management, deployment and configuration of Grid Service lifecycles or inter-organization resources.

== Structure ==
The specification is based on component documents;

1. Document that describes functional requirements, use cases, and high-level architectures, and otherwise serves as a Foundation Document
2. Document outlining the development of a non-XML based Configuration, Description and Deployment Language
3. Document outlining the development of an XML based Configuration, Description and Deployment Language
4. Document outlining the development of a Configuration, Description and Deployment Component Model

== Development Model ==
The development of this API was done through the Global Grid Forum as an open standard, in the model of IETF standard development, and it was originally edited by D. Bell, T. Kojo, P. Goldsack, S. Loughran, D. Milojicic, S. Schaefer, J. Tatemura, and P. Toft.

== Significance ==
System administration in a distributed environment with diverse hardware, software, patch level, and imposed user requirements makes the ability to deploy, manage, and describe services and software configuration difficult. Within a grid, this difficulty is complicated further by the need to have similar service end points, possibly on heterogeneous architectures. Grid service requests may require configuration changes.

This standard provided a framework which described a language and methods that have the ability to describe system configuration, and move system, services, and software towards desired configuration endpoints. Furthermore, it served as the first real attempt to address system administration issues within a grid. CDDLM is to grids, as CFEngine for servers.
