= Catlett (surname) =

Catlett is a surname. Notable people with the surname include:

- Buddy Catlett (1933–2014), American jazz saxophonist
- Charlie Catlett (born 1960), American computer scientist
- Elizabeth Catlett (1915–2012), African-American graphic artist and sculptor
- Gale Catlett (born 1940), American basketball coach
- John Catlett (fl. from 2010), American politician
- Juan Mora Catlett (born 1939), Mexican film and documentary director
- Kyle Catlett (born 2002), American actor
- Mary Jo Catlett (born 1938), American actress and comedian
- Sid Catlett (1910–1951), American jazz drummer
- Walter Catlett (1889–1960), American actor

== See also ==
- George Catlett Marshall Jr. (1880–1959), American statesman and soldier
