= LSF =

LSF may refer to:

== Science and technology ==
- IBM Spectrum LSF, a software job scheduler formerly called Platform LSF
- Laser-stimulated fluorescence, a spectroscopic method
- Late SV40 factor, a protein
- Lightweight steel framing, a building material
- Line spectral frequencies, in signal processing
- Line spread function, in optics

== Organisations ==
- Financial Security Law of France (Loi de sécurité financière)
- Ledøje-Smørum Fodbold, an association football club in Denmark
- Libre Space Foundation, a Greek non-profit space exploration foundation
- Lembaga Sensor Film, a Film Censorship Board of Indonesia

== Other uses ==
- French Sign Language (Langue des signes française)
- Latino sine flexione, a constructed language
- "L.S.F." (song) or "L.S.F. (Lost Souls Forever)", by Kasabian
- Law Society's Final Examination, replaced by the Legal Practice Course, UK
- Liberty Security Force, a faction in the video game Freelancer
