= JobRunr =

- Original author: Ronald Dehuysser
- Developer: JobRunr BV
- Release: April 8, 2020; 6 years ago
- Stable release: 9.0.2 / October 20, 2026; 6 days ago
- Written in: Java
- Operating system: Cross-platform
- Platform: Java
- Type: Library
- License: LGPL-3.0-only
- Website: jobrunr.io
- Repository: github.com/jobrunr/jobrunr

JobRunr is an open-source job-scheduling library for the Java platform that lets developers enqueue, delay, or run recurring background tasks across one or many JVMs while persisting state in a relational or NoSQL data store.

== History ==
JobRunr was first released in April 2020 by Belgian developer Ronald Dehuysser. The project has become a popular alternative to Quartz Scheduler and Spring Batch for cloud-native workloads because of its lightweight API, its integration with frameworks such as Spring or Quarkus, and embedded dashboard. Dehuysser released the initial public version of JobRunr on GitHub during the early COVID-19 lockdowns, positioning it as "Hangfire for Java."

Version 4.0 was the first major milestone and was released in September 2021. InfoQ reported that the release added a job-analysis performance mode, static-method lambda support and optional byte-code caching, together with first-class starters for Spring Boot, Quarkus, and Micronaut.

Six months later, JobRunr 5.0 shipped with default-retry configuration, cron extensions supporting "last-day" semantics and an officially supported Spring Native starter. The update also introduced Duration-based recurrent scheduling and optional MDC propagation in the dashboard logs.

JobRunr 6.0 (February 2023) focused on developer ergonomics: a fluent JobBuilder API, arbitrary job labels, an opt-in Micrometer metrics bridge and performance tweaks that halved enqueue latency in load tests.

JobRunr 7.0 (May 2024) added support for the virtual threads of JDK 21 and switches the worker pool to them automatically when the JVM supports it. It also replaced random UUIDs with time-based UUIDs to reduce database-index fragmentation. The release also moved the @Recurring annotation into the core module and introduced an InMemoryStorageProvider for rapid CI pipelines.

Version 8.0 (July 2025) introduced carbon-aware job scheduling, which uses CO₂ intensity forecasts from the European electricity grid to shift discretionary workloads into periods of cleaner energy. JVM Weekly described the feature as part of a broader movement in the JVM ecosystem toward sustainable computing. The release also added Kotlin serialization support, a redesigned dashboard notification centre, Kubernetes autoscaling metrics with KEDA integration, and a multi-cluster dashboard for monitoring several JobRunr installations from a single console.

Version 8.5 (March 2026) simplified Kotlin support and reduced startup times, while the Pro edition gained external job support and dashboard audit logs. Version 8.6 (May 2026) added support for JDK 26 and Quarkus 3.33 LTS, and improved perfermance for recurring jobs.

Version 9.0 (September 2026) added a chart view to the job history in the dashboard, which shows every attempt of a job and each of its durable steps on a timeline. The release added support for Micronaut 5 and Quarkus 3.40 LTS. The Pro edition gained job analytics in the dashboard, the option to pause and resume a running batch job, and faster job pickup on PostgreSQL through LISTEN/NOTIFY instead of network multicast. Version 9 is the last open-source release that supports Java 8.

== Features ==
JobRunr is used for common background-processing tasks, sending email batches, PDF generation, ETL pipelines or asynchronous REST callbacks, without requiring a separate service bus. Jobs are written as ordinary Java 8 lambdas or method references; at run time the library inspects the byte-code with ASM, serialises the invocation metadata to JSON and stores it via a pluggable StorageProvider (Relational databases, MongoDB, or in-memory).

Its main features include:

- Simple API: three one-liners (enqueue, schedule, scheduleRecurrently) and a more expressive fluent builder added in v 6.0 for complex triggers.
- Distributed execution: optimistic locking ensures that a job is processed by only one server at a time, even when multiple BackgroundJobServer instances poll the same table or collection.
- Dashboard: built-in web server that shows live job graphs, retries and server-health metrics and, since version 5.0, MDC variables for trace propagation.
- Framework integrations: Spring Boot starter (native-image aware), Quarkus extension, Micronaut bean, Jakarta EE CDI wiring and a JUnit 5 test harness.
- Observability: optional Micrometer timers and counters for succeeded, failed and enqueued jobs; structured logs; and SQL-level telemetry.
- Performance options: virtual threads (since version 7.0), time-based UUIDs, cached job analyses, batched SQL and configurable thread counts per server.

=== Carbon-aware scheduling ===
Introduced in version 8.0, carbon-aware scheduling lets developers specify a time window rather than a fixed execution time for recurring jobs. JobRunr then queries CO₂ intensity forecasts, and shifts job execution into the period with the lowest expected emissions. Jobs awaiting an optimal window appear in the dashboard with a green leaf indicator, and operators can see which region's forecast was used. The feature is activated by adding a margin expression such as [PT1H/PT3H] to a cron definition, or by using the CarbonAware.dailyBetween helper method.

== Architecture ==
Internally, JobRunr follows a storage-centric architecture. During scheduling the library captures the target lambda or method, its arguments and metadata; serialises this envelope as JSON and inserts it into a job table (or equivalent collection); commits using optimistic locking so that exactly one caller wins in a cluster. Worker nodes, BackgroundJobServers, poll the storage at a configurable interval (200 ms in fast in-memory mode; 5–15 s in production). When a server claims a job, it deserialises the payload, resolves any Spring or Micronaut beans, executes user code in a worker thread, virtual or platform, and then updates the job state atomically. Failed executions are automatically re-queued with exponential back-off up to a default of ten retries (tunable or overridable per job).

Because the storage layer is abstracted behind a StorageProvider, JobRunr can run on traditional RDBMS systems such as PostgreSQL, MariaDB and Oracle and on NoSQL engines like MongoDB. Each provider supplies SQL or driver-specific concurrency primitives; for example, v 7.0 introduced SELECT … FOR UPDATE SKIP LOCKED for PostgreSQL and MySQL to minimise lock contention.

The dashboard and REST endpoints are packaged so that they do not require a separate service; they share the same transaction scope as job execution, guaranteeing eventually consistent metrics. A commercial "JobRunr Pro" edition layers priority queues, batch chaining and forthcoming carbon-aware scheduling on top of the open-source core.

== AI integration ==
In April 2026, JobRunr co-founder Ronald Dehuysser and Java Champion Markus Eisele published an article arguing that most AI agent frameworks overlook scheduling, retries, and persistence, problems that Java background-job libraries had already solved. Dehuysser wrote that while most agents were effectively stateless chatbots, a real agent "does things when nobody is watching" and needs a proper job scheduling model underneath.

To demonstrate the point, the JobRunr team built ClawRunr (originally called JavaClaw), an open source AI agent runtime written in Java. The project's README described it as "originally created as a demo to show the use of JobRunr." Dehuysser later noted the team expected "a handful of people to try it." Instead the project gained over 200 GitHub stars in its first three days, along with community pull requests and a GraalVM native-image port contributed by Oracle's GraalVM team within the first week.

InfoQ reported that ClawRunr delegates all asynchronous work, including task scheduling, automatic retries with exponential backoff, and dashboard based monitoring, to the JobRunr library. The agent is built on Java 25, Spring Boot, Spring AI, and Spring Modulith, and supports OpenAI, Anthropic, and Ollama as large language model providers. It integrates external tools through the Model Context Protocol (MCP) and communicates through a built in web interface, Telegram, and Discord.

Beyond the ClawRunr project, JobRunr has been used in AI workloads for retrieval augmented generation (RAG), where recurring jobs scan knowledge bases and enqueue parallel embedding updates with automatic retries when language model APIs fail; and for offloading embedding computation from synchronous API request paths to background workers. In May 2025 Oracle published a technical demonstration on its official YouTube channel showing AI vector search combining Spring, JobRunr, and Oracle Database.
