= ObjectWeb ASM =

ASM
- Original author: Eric Bruneton
- Developer: OW2
- Release: 2002; 24 years ago
- Stable release: 9.10.1 / May 23, 2026; 3 months ago
- Written in: Java
- Operating system: Cross-platform
- Type: bytecode Engineering Library
- License: BSD License
- Website: asm.ow2.io
- Repository: gitlab.ow2.org/asm/asm.git

The ASM library is a project of the OW2 consortium. It provides a simple API for decomposing, modifying, and recomposing binary Java classes (i.e. bytecode). The project was originally conceived and developed by Eric Bruneton. ASM is Java-centric at present, and does not currently have a backend that exposes other bytecode implementations (such as .NET bytecode, Python bytecode, etc.).

The name "ASM" is not an acronym: it is just a reference to the asm keyword of C, which allows some functions to be implemented in assembly language.

== Uses ==
ASM provides a simple library that exposes the internal aggregate components of a given Java class through its visitor oriented API. ASM also provides, on top of this visitor API, a tree API that represents classes as object constructs. Both APIs can be used for modifying the binary bytecode, as well as generating new bytecode (via injection of new code into the existing code, or through generation of new classes altogether.) The ASM library has been used in several diverse applications, such as:

Performance and Profiling
Instrumentation calls that capture performance metrics can be injected into Java class binaries to examine memory/coverage data. (For example, injecting instrumentation at entry/exit points.)
Implementation of New Language Semantics
For example, Groovy uses ASM to generate its bytecode. Also, Aspect-Oriented additions to the Java language have been implemented by using ASM to decompose class structures for point-cut identification, and then again when reconstituting the class by injecting aspect-related code back into the binary. (See: AspectWerkz)

=== Invokedynamic ===
Since version 3.2, ASM has added support for the new invokedynamic code, which allows method invocation relying on dynamic type checking on the latest JDK 7 binaries, thus easing support for dynamically typed languages.

== Release history ==
This table presents only releases with significant steps in ObjectWeb ASM history, aside from versions that mainly fixed bugs and improved performance.

Release	Release Date	Highlights
2.0	2005-05-17	Java 5 language support
3.2	2009-06-11	support for the new invokedynamic code.
4.0	2011-10-29	Java 7 language support
5.0	2014-03-16	Java 8 language support
6.0	2017-09-23	Codebase migrated to Gitlab; Java 9 language support
6.1	2018-03-11	Java 10 language support
7.0	2018-10-27	Java 11 language support
7.1	2019-03-03	Java 13 language support
8.0	2020-03-28	Java 14 language support
9.0	2020-09-22	Java 16 language support
9.1	2021-02-06	Java 17 language support
9.2	2021-06-20	Java 18 language support
9.3	2022-04-03	Java 19 language support, new Maven BOM

== See also ==
- Byte Code Engineering Library
- Javassist
