= IMAG =

Large-scale theatrical or concert video projection

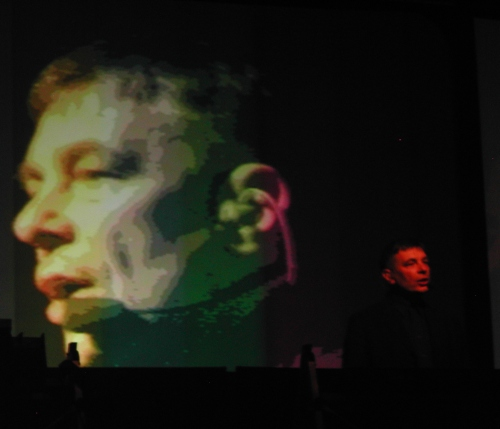
Karl Bartos performing with a video projection of his face on the background.

The term IMAG is a short form for "image magnification" used in the audiovisual production industry. It refers to large-scale theatrical or concert video projection to enable audience members seated at great distance from the stage to see details of the performer's body language and facial expressions that could not be seen with the unaided eye.

IMAG is a technology that uses one or more cameras, projectors, and screens to magnify images of the stage during a live show, allowing the audience to see more clearly. IMAG is utilized in a wide range of live events, including concerts, corporate events, sports games, and religious gatherings. Performers or presenters on stage are captured with high-definition video cameras and projected in real time onto large screens. This enables audience members who are far from the stage to clearly see performers' facial expressions, gestures, and subtle movements, helping provide an immersive experience as if all viewers were seated in the front row.

The time it takes for a video signal to travel from the camera lens to the final display is referred to as latency, and if this delay becomes too long, it can cause discomfort for the audience. This issue is particularly noticeable in seats close to the stage, where mismatches between video and audio can become more pronounced and disrupt immersion. Therefore, when designing an IMAG system, it is important to minimize latency introduced by each component, including cameras, video switchers, and projectors.
