= IBM Tivoli Workload Scheduler =

Workload automation and job scheduling software

HCL Workload Automation
- Other names: IBM Workload Scheduler; IBM Tivoli Workload Scheduler; Maestro
- Developers: HCL Software; formerly IBM, Tivoli Systems and Unison Software
- Type: Workload automation, job scheduling

IBM Tivoli Workload Scheduler (TWS) is a job scheduling and workload automation product that originated as Maestro, a scheduler developed by Unison Software. Unison was acquired in 1997 by Tivoli Systems, which IBM had bought the year before, and Maestro was integrated into the Tivoli product line as Tivoli Workload Scheduler. The product was renamed IBM Workload Scheduler in 2015, and development was transferred to HCL Technologies under an IBM partnership beginning in 2016. It is now marketed by HCL Software as HCL Workload Automation.

== History ==
=== Unison Software and Maestro ===
Unison Software, based in Santa Clara, California, began in 1979 selling job scheduling software for Hewlett-Packard's HP 3000 line running the MPE operating system. The company ported its software to Unix in the early 1990s and merged with the backup software company Tymlabs in 1992. Its flagship Maestro scheduler was sold alongside other Unison products for storage and output management.

=== Tivoli and IBM ===
IBM announced an agreement to acquire Tivoli Systems, an Austin, Texas systems management software company, on 31 January 1996, at a net cash cost to IBM of about $743 million.

In September 1997, IBM's Tivoli Systems division agreed to acquire Unison Software, with IBM's net cost reported at about $170 million. Tivoli had previously worked with Unison and had recommended Maestro in preference to its own TME job-scheduling module. Tivoli's chief executive, Frank Moss, said at the time that Maestro would continue to be sold as a separate product and that Unison's existing relationships with other vendors would be maintained, while the software would be integrated into Tivoli's TME management framework. Tivoli completed the acquisition afterward. Unison announced Maestro 6.0, with a multi-tier architecture and support for Unix, Windows NT, MVS and MPE, immediately after the deal.

Maestro was subsequently renamed Tivoli Workload Scheduler. IBM's mainframe scheduler, OPC, was developed separately by IBM and was later marketed as Tivoli Workload Scheduler for z/OS; IBM's documentation describes version 8.2 as further integrating the OPC-based and Maestro-based scheduling engines.

=== IBM Workload Scheduler ===
With version 9.3, released in 2015, IBM dropped the Tivoli brand: the product family became IBM Workload Automation and the product became IBM Workload Scheduler. Tivoli Workload Scheduler for Applications, previously a separate add-on, was folded into the base product at the same time.

=== HCL ===
In October 2016, IBM appointed HCL Technologies to take over development of several software brands, including Tivoli Workload Scheduler, with IBM developers and support staff transferred to HCL. When HCL formally launched its HCL Software division in July 2019, it listed Workload Automation 9.5 among the products it had released. In April 2020, HCL announced Workload Automation 9.5.0.2, and IBM and HCL jointly announced the release. HCL later introduced HCL Workload Automation for z/OS, which it describes as continuing the development lineage of IBM Workload Scheduler for z/OS.

== Architecture ==
IBM's documentation describes Tivoli Workload Scheduler as the base product, or engine, of the Tivoli Workload Automation family, used to automate, plan and control workload production. A deployment consists of a master domain manager and optional backup, fault-tolerant agents, and dynamic domain managers, managed through the web-based Dynamic Workload Console; the scheduler stores its data in a relational database such as Db2 or Oracle.

== See also ==
- Workload automation
- Job scheduler
- HCL Software
