= Thomas Sterling (computing) =

American computer scientist (born 1949)

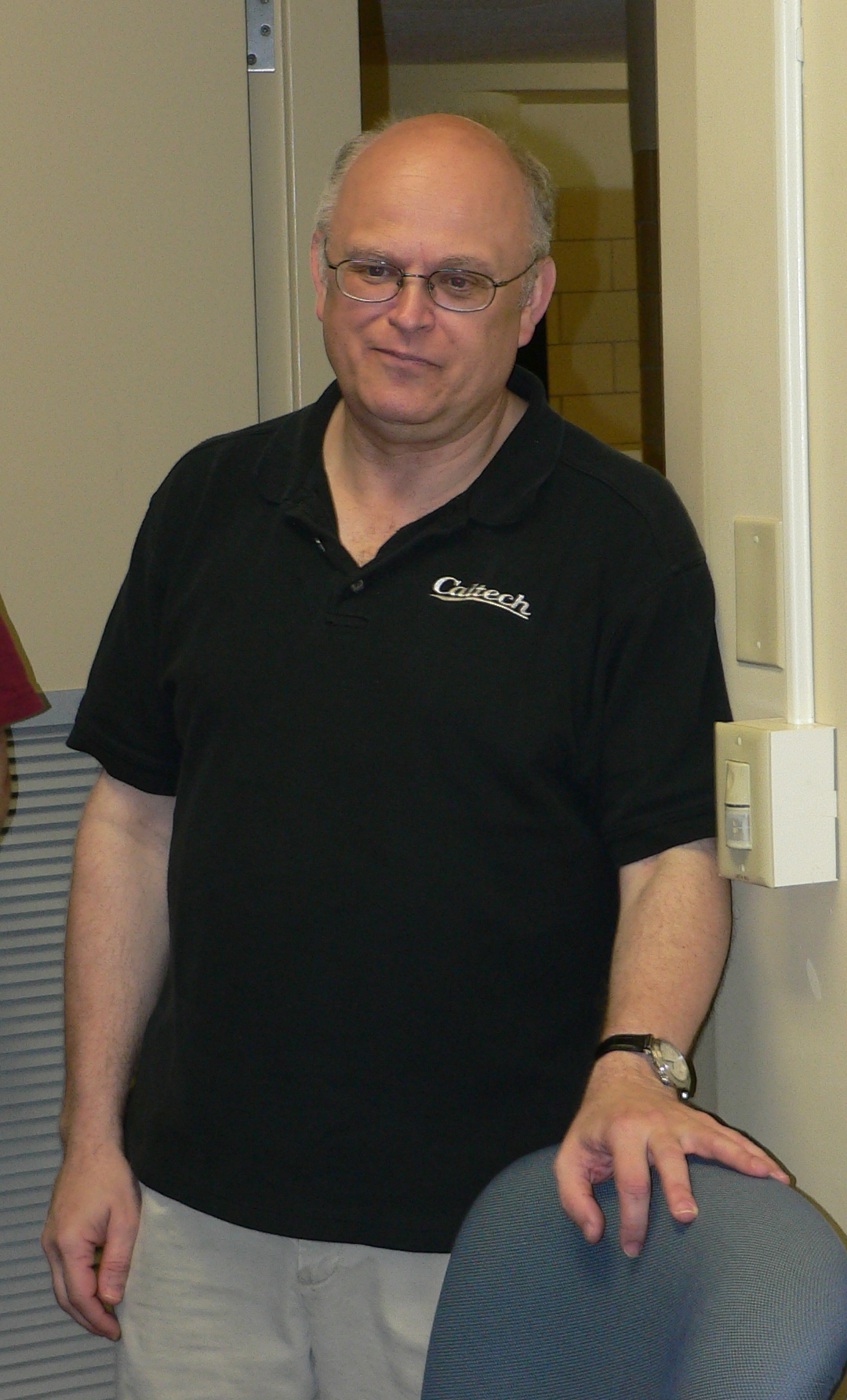
- Thomas Sterling
- Born: December 18, 1949 (age 76); New York City, United States
- Education: Old Dominion University(BSEE); Massachusetts Institute of Technology (SMEE, EE, and PhD)
- Occupations: Professor, Researcher
- Known for: Beowulf Commodity Cluster Computing, Hybrid Technology Multi-Threaded Architecture, ParalleX Execution Model, HPX Runtime System, Continuum Computer Architecture, Active Memory Architecture,
- Awards: Fellow at American Association for Advancement of Science(2015)(AAAS) Senior Member of Institute for Electrical and Electronic Engineering(2012)(IEEE); Gordon Bell Prize(1997); Vanguard Award(2016); Fellow of International Supercomputing Conference(2007)(ISC) Hertz Fellowship(1981)
- Scientific career
- Fields: Electrical Engineering; Computer Science; Parallel computing Cluster computing Non-von Neumann Architecture
- Workplaces: Indiana University; Louisiana State University; California Institute of Technology; NASA - Jet Propulsion Laboratory; NASA - Goddard Space Flight Center; University of Maryland; Institute for Defense Analysis (IDA); Harris Corporation
- Thesis: Parallel Control Flow
- Doctoral advisor: Robert H. Halstead
- Website: http://www.soic.indiana.edu/all-people/profile.html?profile_id=303

Thomas Sterling (born December 18, 1949) is a full professor for the Department of Intelligent Systems Engineering (ISE) at Indiana University (IU) Bloomington. At Indiana University, he is the Director of the Artificial Intelligence Computing Systems Laboratory (AICSL). He received his Ph.D. in 1984 at MIT. For more than four decades, Thomas Sterling has dedicated his professional contributions to research for advancements in parallel high-performance computing. Dr. Sterling is best known as the “father of Beowulf” clusters. Among his other early accomplishments, Dr. Sterling was Principal investigator for the multi-agency multi-institution Hybrid Technology Multi-Threaded Project (HTMT) for advanced research on Petaflops computing systems. Professor Sterling currently leads advanced research in non-von Neumann parallel architecture, ParalleX execution model, and HPX+ runtime system for scalable dynamic irregular graph-based knowledge-oriented artificial intelligence applications. Thomas Sterling is also President and co-founder of Simultac LLC, an advanced computing technology engineering company. Professor Sterling is the co-author of eight books and holds seven patents. Thomas Sterling is a Fellow of the AAAS and winner of the Gordon Bell Prize.

== Education ==
Sterling began his undergraduate studies in 1968 at the Polytechnic Institute of Brooklyn completing his BSEE degree in 1972 (Summa Cum Laude) from the Old Dominion University. Upon separation from the US Navy in 1977, he matriculated at the Massachusetts Institute of Technology (MIT). Thomas Sterling earned his SMEE from MIT in 1981, his EE in 1983, and his Ph.D. in 1984 as a Hertz Fellow under the supervision of Prof. Robert H. Halstead.
