= PelicanHPC =

Operating system

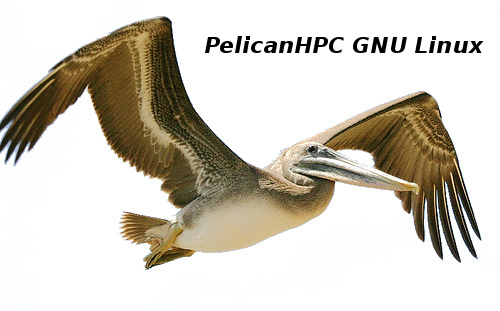
- PelicanHPC

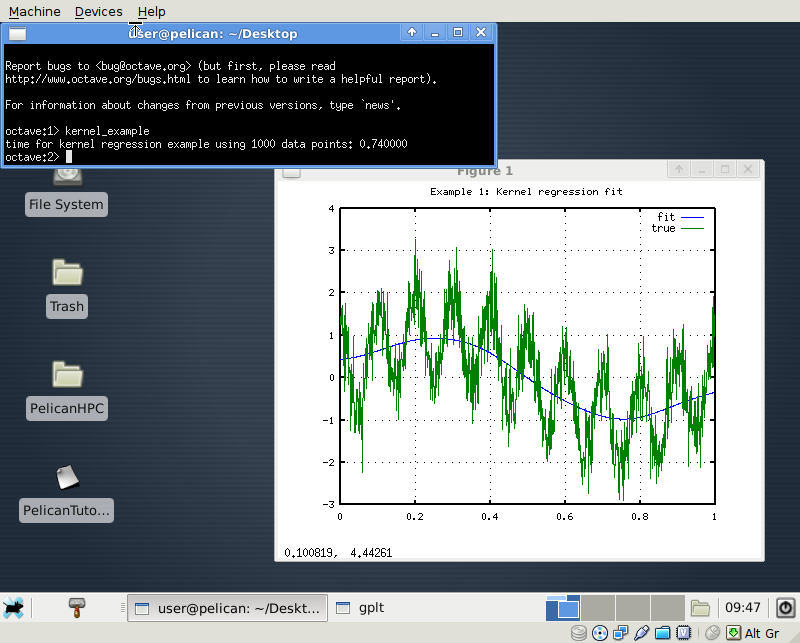
- PelicanHPC 2.9
- OS family: Unix-like
- Working state: Active
- Source model: Open source
- Latest release: 6.1 / September 12, 2025; 4 months ago
- Kernel type: Monolithic
- Default user interface: Bash, Xfce, Gnome
- License: Various
- Official website: https://sourceforge.net/projects/pelicanhpc/ idea.uab.es (archived)

PelicanHPC is an operating system based on Debian Live, which provides a rapid means of setting up a high performance computer cluster.

PelicanHPC was formerly known as ParallelKNOPPIX. PelicanHPC transitioned to its current name to better reflect its capabilities and focus on high-performance computing. The first version of PelicanHPC was released in 2008, and it has since evolved through several iterations. The latest stable release (version 6.1) was launched on September 11, 2025 and is based on Debian 13.1 (Trixie).

== Versions ==
Version	Date	Based on
ParallelKNOPPIX 2004-11-25	2004-11-25	Old Debian versions
ParallelKNOPPIX 2004-12-16	2004-12-16	Old Debian versions
ParallelKNOPPIX 2005-01-10	2005-01-10	Old Debian versions
ParallelKNOPPIX 2005-03-01	2005-03-01	Old Debian versions
ParallelKNOPPIX 2005-04-01	2005-04-01	Old Debian versions
ParallelKNOPPIX 2005-04-25	2005-04-25	Old Debian versions
ParallelKNOPPIX 2005-06-02	2005-06-02	Old Debian versions
ParallelKNOPPIX 2005-08-02	2005-08-02	Old Debian versions
ParallelKNOPPIX 2005-12-02	2005-12-02	Old Debian versions
ParallelKNOPPIX 2006-02-20	2006-02-20	Old Debian versions
ParallelKNOPPIX 2006-05-05	2006-05-05	Old Debian versions
ParallelKNOPPIX 2006-06-19	2006-06-19	Old Debian versions
ParallelKNOPPIX 2.0	2006-12-01	Old Debian versions
ParallelKNOPPIX 2.2	2007-01-01	Old Debian versions
ParallelKNOPPIX 2.3	2007-01-25	Old Debian versions
ParallelKNOPPIX 2.4	2007-02-24	Old Debian versions
ParallelKNOPPIX 2.8	2007-11-22	Old Debian versions
PelicanHPC GNU Linux 1.3	2008-03-01	Old Debian versions
PelicanHPC 1.5.1	2008-05-20	Old Debian versions
PelicanHPC 1.8	2009-02-04	Old Debian versions
PelicanHPC 1.9.3	2009-11-13	Old Debian versions
PelicanHPC 2.0	2010-01-13	Old Debian versions
PelicanHPC 2.2	2010-09-11	Old Debian versions
PelicanHPC 2.3	2011-01-12	Old Debian versions
PelicanHPC 2.9	2013-01-10	Debian 6 Squeeze
PelicanHPC 3.0	2014-10-30	Debian 7 Wheezy
PelicanHPC 3.1	2015-02-17	Debian 7.8 Wheezy
PelicanHPC 4.1	2016-12-30	Debian 8.6 Jessie
PelicanHPC 5.1	2024-08-28	Debian 12.6 Bookworm
PelicanHPC 6.1	2025-09-11	Debian 13.1 Trixie
