= Web Services Distributed Management =

Web Services Distributed Management (WSDM, pronounced wisdom) is a web service standard for managing and monitoring the status of other services.

The goal of WSDM is to allow a well-defined network protocol for controlling any other service that is WSDM-compliant. For example, a third-party digital dashboard or network management system could be used to monitor the status or performance of other services, and potentially take corrective actions to restart services if failures occur. Some aspects of WSDM overlap or displace functionality of SNMP.

== Specifications ==
WSDM 1.0 was approved as an OASIS standard on March 9, 2005. The approval of the WSDM 1.1 specification occurred on September 7, 2006.

WSDM consists of two specifications:

- Management Using Web Services (MUWS) — WSDM MUWS defines how to represent and access the manageability interfaces of resources as Web services. It defines a basic set of manageability capabilities, such as resource identity, metrics, configuration, and relationships, which can be composed to express the capability of the management instrumentation. WSDM MUWS also provides a standard management event format to improve interoperability and correlation.
- Management Of Web Services (MOWS) — WSDM MOWS defines how to manage Web services as resources and how to describe and access that manageability using MUWS. MOWS provides mechanisms and methodologies that enable manageable Web services applications to interoperate across enterprise and organizational boundaries.

== See also ==
- OASIS (organization) (Organization for the Advancement of Structured Information Standards)
