= Charlie Catlett =

American computer scientist

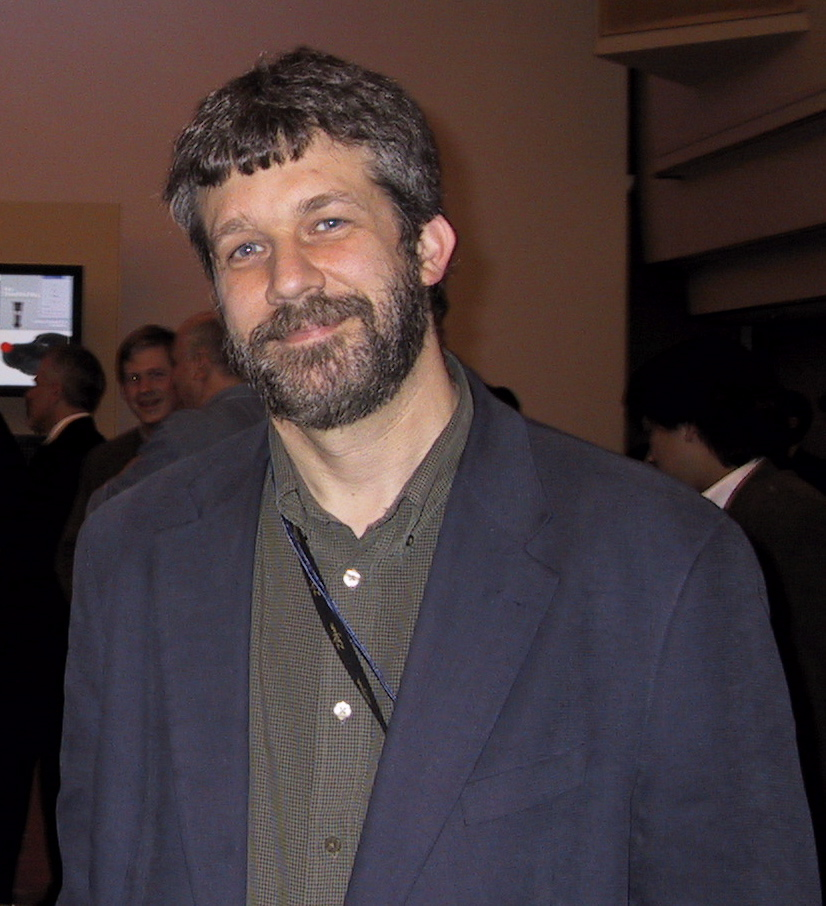
Charlie Catlett (2006)

Charlie Catlett (born 1960) is a senior computer scientist at Argonne National Laboratory and a visiting senior fellow at the University of Chicago. From 2020 to 2022 he was a senior research scientist at the University of Illinois. He was previously a senior computer scientist at Argonne National Laboratory and a senior fellow in the Computation Institute, a joint institute of Argonne National Laboratory and The University of Chicago, and a senior fellow at the University of Chicago's Harris School of Public Policy.

== Research ==
From 2007-2011 he was chief information officer and director of the Computing and Information Systems Division at Argonne National Laboratory. From 2004 to 2007 he was director of the TeraGrid Project.

Prior to joining Argonne in 2000, Catlett was chief technology officer at the National Center for Supercomputing Applications (NCSA). He was part of the original team that established NCSA in 1985 and his early work there included participation on the team that deployed and managed the NSFNet. In the early 1990s Catlett participated in the DARPA/NSF Gigabit Testbeds Initiative, coordinated by the Corporation for National Research Initiatives.

Catlett was the founding chair of the Global Grid Forum (GGF, now Open Grid Forum) from 1999 through 2004.

He has been involved in Grid (distributed) computing since the early 1990s, when he co-authored (with Larry Smarr) a seminal paper "Metacomputing" in the Communications of the ACM, which outlined many of the high-level goals of what is today called Grid computing.

== Selected publications ==
- "Hands-On Computer Science: The Array of Things Experimental Urban Instrument," Charlie Catlett, Pete Beckman, Nicola Ferrier, Michael E. Papka, Rajesh Sankaran, Jeff Solin, Valerie Taylor, Douglas Pancoast, Daniel A. Reed, Computing in Science & Engineering, vol. 24, no. 1, pp. 57-63, 1 Jan.-Feb. 2022, doi: 10.1109/MCSE.2021.3139405
- "Measuring Cities with Software-Defined Sensors," Charlie Catlett, Pete Beckman, Nicola Ferrier, Howard Nusbaum, Michael E. Papka, Marc G. Berman, Journal of Social Computing, Volume 1, Issue 1, September 2020.
- "Software-Defined Sensors: using Edge Computing to Revolutionize Sensing," Charlie Catlett, Pete Beckman, Rajesh Sankaran, Nicola Ferrier, Songha Kim, Yeongho Park, American Geophysical Union, Fall Meeting 2019, abstract #IN34A-01.
- "Array of Things: a scientific research instrument in the public way: platform design and early lessons learned," Charlie Catlett, Pete Beckman, Rajesh Sankaran, Kate Kusiak Galvin, SCOPE'17: Proceedings of the 2nd International Workshop on Science of Smart City Operations and Platforms Engineering, April 2017.
- "A Report to the President: Technology and the Future of Cities," President's Council of Advisors on Science and Technology, February 2016.
- "Plenario: An Open Data Discovery and Exploration Platform for Urban Science," Charlie Catlett, Tanu Malika, Brett Goldstein, Jonathan Giuffrida, Yetong Shaoa, Alessandro Panella, Derek Eder, Eric van Zanten, Robert Mitchum, Severin Thalerc, Ian Foster, IEEE Computer Society Bulletin of the Technical Committee on Data Engineering, December 2014, Vol. 37 No. 4
- "A Scientific Research and Development Approach to Cyber Security," Charlie Catlett, editor, A report presented to the Department of Energy Office of Science, December 2008.
- "TeraGrid: Analysis of Organization, System Architecture, and Middleware Enabling New Types of Applications," Charlie Catlett et al., HPC and Grids in Action, ed. Lucio Grandinetti, IOS Press Advances in Parallel Computing series, Amsterdam, 2008.
- Witness Testimony, U.S. House Committee on Energy and Commerce, May 2004.
- "Global Grid Forum Documents and Recommendations: Process and Requirements (GFD.1)", Global Grid Forum Document Series, June 2001.
- "Standards for Grid Computing: Global Grid Forum", Journal of Grid Computing, Vol. 1, May 2003.
- Reed, D. A.; Giles, R. C.; Catlett, C. E. (1997). "Distributed data and immersive collaboration". Communications of the ACM. 40 (11): 38. doi:10.1145/265684.265691. S2CID 18151101.
- Stevens, R.; Woodward, P.; Defanti, T.; Catlett, C. (1997). "From the I-WAY to the National Technology Grid". Communications of the ACM. 40 (11): 50. doi:10.1145/265684.265692. S2CID 16403107.
- "Catlett, C. E. (1992). "In search of gigabit applications". IEEE Communications Magazine. 30 (4): 42–51. doi:10.1109/35.135788. S2CID 21808434.Winner, IEEE Communications Society Fred W. Ellersick Prize 1992
- "Balancing Resources", IEEE Spectrum Magazine, September 1992.
- "Metacomputing," Larry Smarr and Charlie Catlett, Communications of the ACM, Vol. 35, No. 6, June 1992.
