= Open Source Cluster Application Resources =

Open Source Cluster Application Resources (OSCAR) is a Linux-based software installation for high-performance cluster computing. OSCAR allows users to install a Beowulf type high performance computing cluster.

== See also ==
- TORQUE Resource Manager
- Maui Cluster Scheduler
- Beowulf cluster
