= DCache =

dCache (from. disk Cache) is a system for storing and retrieving huge amounts of data, that are distributed among a large number of heterogeneous server nodes, under a single virtual filesystem tree with a variety of standard access methods.

The dCache project started in 2000 as a collaboration of Deutsches Electron-Synchrotron (DESY) and Fermilab National Accelerator Laboratory. Today dCache is a joint venture between the Deutsches Elektronen-Synchrotron, the Fermi National Accelerator Laboratory, and the Nordic e-Infrastructure collaboration.

dCache is open source software built in Java and is used in the Scientific Fields of Astronomy, Biology and Physics. dCache is used at the Worldwide LHC Computing Grid project to store some results of the Large Hadron Collider. Ten out of fourteen Tier-1 sites to CERN are using this storage solution.

dCache provides methods for exchanging data with backend (tertiary) storage systems as well as space management, pool attraction, dataset replication, hot spot determination and recovery from disk or node failures. Connected to a tertiary storage system, the dcache software ecosystem offers a simulated unlimited direct accessible storage space. Data exchanges to and from the underlying hierarchical storage management system are performed automatically and invisibly to the user. Beside through protocols specific to high-energy physics, data in dCache can be accessed via NFSv4.1 as well as through WebDAV.

dCache is often used as a WORM Storage Solution on FS Level. This got archived by making the written file immutable to the user.
