= Quartz (scheduler) =

- Written in: Java
- Platform: Java
- Type: Library
- License: Apache-2.0
- Website: quartz-scheduler.org
- Repository: github.com/quartz-scheduler/quartz

Quartz is a job scheduling library that can be integrated into a wide variety of Java applications.

Quartz is generally used for enterprise class applications to support process workflow, system management (maintenance) actions and to provide timely services within the applications. Quartz also supports clustering.

Quartz is an open-source product from the Terracotta company.

There is also a port to .NET, called Quartz.NET. The main part of the framework is the Scheduler, which takes care of managing the runtime environment for user application.
