= TORQUE =

- Developer: Adaptive computing
- Initial release: 2003
- Stable release: 7.0 / 27 January 2023; 3 years ago
- Written in: ANSI C
- Operating system: Unix-like
- Size: 5 MB
- Available in: English
- Type: Distributed resource manager
- License: Proprietary License (As of June 2018), OpenPBS version 2.3 (non-free in DFSG)
- Website: adaptivecomputing.com/cherry-services/torque-resource-manager/

The Terascale Open-source Resource and Queue Manager (TORQUE) is a distributed resource manager designed to oversee batch jobs and distributed compute nodes. It offers control and management capabilities for clusters, aiding in utilization, scheduling, and administration tasks.

TORQUE can be integrated with either the non-commercial Maui Cluster Scheduler or the commercial Moab Workload Manager, providing enhanced functionality and optimization for cluster environments.

Initially based on the Portable Batch System (PBS), the TORQUE community has expanded its capabilities to improve scalability, fault tolerance, and overall functionality. Notable contributors to TORQUE include organizations such as NCSA, OSC, USC, the US DOE, Sandia, PNNL, UB, TeraGrid and other High-Performance Computing (HPC) entities.

As of June 2018, TORQUE is no longer considered open-source software due to licensing issues. It was previously described as open-source software and utilized the OpenPBS version 2.3 license, but was categorized as non-free software according to the Debian Free Software Guidelines.

== See also ==
- Job scheduler § Batch queuing for HPC clusters
- Beowulf cluster
- HTCondor
- Maui Cluster Scheduler
- Open Source Cluster Application Resources (OSCAR)
- Portable Batch System
- Slurm Workload Manager
- Univa Grid Engine
