= Intel Cluster Ready =

The Intel Cluster Ready certification is a marketing program from Intel. It is aimed at hardware and software vendors in the low-end and mid-range cluster market. To get certified, systems have to fulfill a minimum set of cluster-specific requirements. This way, vendors of parallel software can build their applications on a basic cluster platform, trusting certain components to be present. Other drivers, libraries and tools will have to be provided by the software vendor or its partners, or by a system integrator.

== Description ==
The program was announced in June 2007. The nodes of an Intel Cluster Ready compliant cluster are based on Xeon server processors and PC hardware, interconnected through Ethernet or InfiniBand. The operating system is a Linux distribution conforming to a specific file system layout. Also included are Intel's closed source but publicly available parallel libraries: the Message Passing Interface, Threading Building Blocks, and Math Kernel Library.

Intel only specifies the requirements a cluster has to fulfill to get certified. The specific implementation is the responsibility of the platform vendor. Intel's Cluster Checker checks the system's compliance. It is not only deployed by the vendor, the integrator and the end user to verify the system, it can also be used to troubleshoot an operational cluster.

While cluster hardware gets certified, software can be registered as well. Intel provides a minimal cluster infrastructure where software vendors can run their package, test scripts and test data. After successful completion, the application gets registered as being Intel Cluster Ready compliant. The Cluster Ready program is free for both hardware and software vendors.

The Intel Cluster Ready program does not primarily include the high-end clusters used for scientific calculations at universities and research institutes. It aims to commoditize the parallel systems used for industrial and commercial applications. According to IDC, more than half of the servers currently sold for technical applications is deployed as part of a cluster. For example, these systems are used for industrial computations, financial analyses, and modelling in engineering. IDC expects clustered systems to responsible for more than three-quarters of the high-performance technical computing market.

== AMD-based clusters ==
Although the Cluster Ready program is aimed at systems built on Intel's Xeon processors, the Cluster Checker can also be used to verify an Advanced Micro Devices-based system. Intel's parallel libraries run on AMD hardware with the same performance and are fully supported by Intel. According to Werner Krotz-Vogel, Technical Marketing Engineer at Intel's Cluster Ready team, the Math Kernel Library (MKL) runs even faster than the open source library Automatically Tuned Linear Algebra Software (ATLAS) on an AMD Opteron system.
