= OW2 =

Non-profit consortium for open-source software

- Formation: 1 January 2007; 19 years ago
- Type: Consortium
- Legal status: Non-Profit
- Purpose: Open Source Software Development
- Headquarters: Paris
- Members: Around 6000
- CEO: Cédric Thomas
- Staff: 8 employees
- Website: www.ow2.org

OW2 is an independent non-profit international consortium dedicated to developing open-source software code infrastructure for middleware information systems. OW2 federates IT vendors and users, universities, and research centers from Europe, Asia, and the Americas, representing IT professionals.

== History ==
OW2 was founded in 2007 as an independent organization to foster the ObjectWeb code base of open source middleware. ObjectWeb was a joint project launched in 2002 by INRIA, Bull, and France Telecom; in 2005 INRIA signed an agreement with OrientWare, a joint project between Peking University, Beijing University of Aeronautics and Astronautics (now Beihang University), National University of Defense Technology, CVIC Software Engineering Co., Ltd, and the Institute of Software at the Chinese Academy of Sciences. All became founding members of OW2 along with Engineering, Red Hat, and Thales Group.

== Activities ==
=== Projects ===
OW2 hosts circa 100 open-source projects. Projects make up the OW2 code base and are foundation of all OW2 activities. Projects can be submitted into the OW2 code base after meeting some minimum requirements and applying. At this point, a Project is considered to be in "Incubation," the first of OW2's defined lifecycle stages. Upon gaining code contributors, growing, and meeting rigorous requirements, a project can apply for "mature" status. The application is then reviewed by the OW2 Technology Council and granted mature status or kept in incubation. If a project stops evolving and updating, it can then be moved to the third lifecycle stage, "Archive," where it is no longer active but can use OW2's infrastructure services.

==== Hosting ====
In 2008, only a year after its founding, OW2 began hosting its projects via Concurrent Versions System (CVS) and Apache Subversion (SVN) using GForge. Later, support for CVS was disabled and hosting via Git using Gitorious began. In 2018, only a decade after it had begun using it, OW2 decommissioned its use of GForge and SVN in lieu of Git, after having migrated to using GitLab.

== OW2con ==
OW2con is an annual conference for the OW2 community, organized since 2009.
