= Maui Cluster Scheduler =

- Developer: Cluster Resources, Inc.
- Type: job scheduler
- License: Moab Scheduling System - End User Open Source License
- Website: www.adaptivecomputing.com/products/open-source/maui/

Maui Cluster Scheduler is a job scheduler for use on clusters and supercomputers initially developed by Cluster Resources, Inc. Maui is capable of supporting multiple scheduling policies, dynamic priorities, reservations, and fairshare capabilities.

It improves the manageability and efficiency of machines ranging from clusters of a few processors to multi-teraflops supercomputers. Maui is available for use and modification for non-commercial usage.

== Development and support ==
Maui was most heavily developed during the mid-90s. Development slowed into the 2000s, although an active community around the usage of Maui still exists. Its development was made possible by the support of Cluster Resources, Inc. (now Adaptive Computing) and the contributions of many individuals and sites including the U.S. Department of Energy, PNNL, the Center for High Performance Computing at the University of Utah (CHPC), Ohio Supercomputer Center (OSC), University of Southern California (USC), SDSC, MHPCC, BYU, NCSA, and many others. It may be downloaded, modified and redistributed.

Maui Cluster Scheduler is currently maintained and supported by Adaptive Computing, Inc., although most new development has come to a standstill. A next-generation non-open-source scheduler is part of the Moab Cluster Suite and borrows many of the same concepts found in Maui. Maui's developers state that the licence satisfies some definitions of open-source software and that it is not available for commercial usage.

Adaptive Computing's Maui project is not associated with the Maui Scheduler Molokini Edition, which was developed as a project on the SourceForge site independent of the original Maui scheduler, under the GNU Lesser General Public License. The Molokini Edition's most recent release was in 2005.

== See also ==
- HTCondor
- Open Source Cluster Application Resources (OSCAR)
- TORQUE Resource Manager
- Beowulf cluster
