= Portable Batch System =

Computer software that performs job scheduling

Portable Batch System (or simply PBS) is the name of computer software that performs job scheduling. Its primary task is to allocate computational tasks, i.e., batch jobs, among the available computing resources. It is often used in conjunction with UNIX cluster environments.

PBS is supported as a job scheduler mechanism by several meta schedulers including Moab by Adaptive Computing Enterprises and GRAM (Grid Resource Allocation Manager), a component of the Globus Toolkit.

== History and versions ==
PBS was originally developed for NASA under a contract project that began on June 17, 1991. The main contractor who developed the original code was MRJ Technology Solutions. MRJ was acquired by Veridian in the late 1990s. Altair Engineering acquired the rights to all the PBS technology and intellectual property from Veridian in 2003. Altair Engineering currently owns and maintains the intellectual property associated with PBS, and also employs the original development team from NASA.

The following versions of PBS are currently available:

- OpenPBS — original open source version released by MRJ in 1998.
- TORQUE — a fork of OpenPBS that is maintained by Adaptive Computing Enterprises, Inc. (formerly Cluster Resources, Inc.)
- PBS Professional (PBS Pro) — the version of PBS offered by Altair Engineering that is dual licensed under an open source and a commercial license. Note that the non-commercial offering is called OpenPBS, not to be confused with the outdated software originally released in 1998.

== License ==
The license for PBS derived programs allows redistribution accompanied by information on how to obtain the source code and modifications, and requires an acknowledgement in any advertising clause mentioning use of the software (compare the BSD advertising clause). Prior to 2002, PBS and derivative programs (OpenPBS) prohibited commercial redistribution of the software, required registration at the OpenPBS website, and required attribution when PBS contributed to a published research project. These requirements, which did not meet the Open Source Initiative's definition of open source, were set to expire on December 31, 2001.

Today, OpenPBS, the "community edition" of PBS Professional, is distributed under GNU Affero General Public License.
