= IBM Spectrum LSF =

Job scheduler

LSF
- Developers: IBM (current); Platform Computing (former)
- Stable release: 10.1.0 (10.1.0.16) / July 2026
- Operating system: AIX, HP-UX, Linux, Windows, macOS, Solaris
- Type: Job scheduler
- License: Proprietary
- Website: IBM Spectrum LSF

IBM Spectrum LSF (LSF, originally Platform Load Sharing Facility) is a workload management platform, job scheduler, for distributed high performance computing (HPC) by IBM.

== Details ==
It can be used to execute batch jobs on networked Unix and Windows systems on many different architectures. LSF was based on the Utopia research project at the University of Toronto.

In 2007, Platform released Platform Lava, which is a simplified version of LSF based on an old version of LSF release, licensed under GNU General Public License v2. The project was discontinued in 2011, succeeded by OpenLava.

In January 2012, Platform Computing was acquired by IBM. The product is now called IBM Spectrum LSF.

IBM Spectrum LSF Community Edition is a no-charge community edition of the IBM Spectrum LSF workload management platform.

== See also ==
- Sun Grid Engine
- HTCondor
