= Andy Konwinski =

American computer scientist and businessman (born 1983)

- Born: October 15, 1983 (age 43); Wisconsin, United States
- Education: University of Wisconsin–Oshkosh, Fox Cities Campus (AAS); University of Wisconsin-Madison (BS); University of California, Berkeley (MS, PhD)
- Known for: Co-founding Databricks; Co-founding Perplexity; Laude Institute; Laude Ventures; Konwinski Prize; Apache Mesos; Apache Spark
- Children: 2
- Scientific career
- Fields: Computer Science
- Workplaces: Databricks; Perplexity; Laude Institute; Laude Ventures; UC Berkeley
- Thesis: Multi-agent Cluster Scheduling for Scalability and Flexibility (2012)
- Doctoral advisor: Randy H. Katz
- Website: andykonwinski.com

Andy Konwinski (born October 15, 1983) is an American computer scientist, businessman, and billionaire. He is known for co-founding Databricks, a data analytics and artificial intelligence (AI) platform, and for his early contributions to Apache Spark. He also co-founded Perplexity, an AI-powered search engine; the early-stage venture capital firm Laude Ventures; and Laude Institute, a nonprofit institute for computer science researchers. His work bridges research and real-world deployment in software infrastructure and artificial intelligence.

== Early life and education ==
Andy Konwinski was born on October 15, 1983, in rural Wisconsin to a religious family of Jehovah's Witnesses. His father worked as a machinist, and his mother was a homemaker and school bus driver. Raised in the Jehovah's Witness faith, Konwinski and his four siblings frequently traveled with their parents, who were senior leaders in the organization, to religious conventions.

During high school, Konwinski began to question the tenets of his religion. His inquiries were discouraged by the community, and at age 18, he was disfellowshipped (expelled) from the faith. Consequently, he was estranged from his community and family members. Following a period of personal difficulty, a high school counselor encouraged him to pursue higher education.

Konwinski attended a trade school and University of Wisconsin–Oshkosh, Fox Cities Campus before transferring to the University of Wisconsin–Madison. After receiving his undergraduate degree from the University of Wisconsin–Madison, Konwinski received his PhD from UC Berkeley, advised by Randy H. Katz.

== Career ==
=== 2013–2022: Apache Spark and Databricks ===
While at UC Berkeley, Konwinski was an early organizer of the Computer Science Graduate Entrepreneurs club. Working in the computer lab alongside fellow researcher Matei Zaharia, he helped develop open-source architectures for large-scale data processing, including Apache Mesos and Apache Spark.

In 2013, Konwinski, Zaharia, and five other researchers founded Databricks to commercialize their open-source work. Konwinski's early role in the company was akin to a product manager; he focused on community building, organizing user conferences, and assisting early customers with software deployment. He stepped back from day-to-day operations in 2019.

=== 2022–present: Perplexity and Laude ===
After leaving daily operations at Databricks, Konwinski began investing in early-stage startups. Through his initial investment fund, Computer Science Graduate Ventures (CSGV), he met Aravind Srinivas. In 2022, he co-founded the AI-powered search engine Perplexity AI with Aravind Srinivas, Denis Yarats, and Johnny Ho.

In 2024, he co-founded Laude Ventures, an early stage venture firm focused on investing in technical founders, mostly with research backgrounds, with Pete Sonsini and Andrew Krioukov. In 2025, he pledged $100M to establish Laude Institute, an organization for computer science researchers, with Dave Patterson, Jeff Dean, and Joelle Pineau.

He co-teaches UC Berkeley’s Research to Startup seminar.

== Research ==
Konwinski has co-authored several influential papers, including "Shaping AI's Impact on Billions of Lives" (2024) with David Patterson, Jeff Dean, John L. Hennessy, Mariano-Florentino Cuéllar, and Finale Doshi-Velez; Dominant Resource Fairness (2011) with Ali Ghodsi, Matei Zaharia, Benjamin Hindman, Scott Shenker, and Ion Stoica; and "A Berkeley View of Cloud Computing" (2009) with David Patterson, Ion Stoica, and Matei Zaharia.

Konwinski is also co-author of the O’Reilly Learning Spark Book.

== Personal life ==
Konwinski is married and has two daughters.

== Recognition ==
In 2025, Konwinski delivered the commencement address at the University of California, Berkeley for the College of Computing, Data Science, and Society. The address took place over two ceremonies at the Greek Theatre in Berkeley, California.

At the 2024 NeurIPS conference in Vancouver, he announced the Konwinski Prize, a $1 million competition to advance AI capabilities in real-world software engineering, by incentivizing open-source progress on a contamination-free version of the SWE-Bench benchmark.

In 2025, Konwinski and Turing Award recipient David Patterson gave academic talks on their "Shaping AI" paper to university computer science departments across the United States.
