= Sky computing =

Technical concept, the evolution of Cloud Computing

Sky computing is a paradigm that aims to develop the cloud computing model further. It aims to combine existing clouds of different service providers into a comprehensive, interoperable Sky. The concept behind sky computing is to create a cloud of clouds that behaves in a similar way to the internet, which consists of a network of networks.

== Description ==
Sky computing aims to achieve a complete abstraction of cloud resources from different providers so that applications and users can access these resources without having to worry about where the resources or services are located in the individual clouds. The key features of Sky Computing include:

- Cloud of clouds: a unified, interoperable cloud made up of numerous individual clouds.
- Levels of abstraction: These ensure the interoperability of clouds.
- Distributed infrastructure: A comprehensive infrastructure for cloud services.
- Dynamic scalability: Resources can be scaled dynamically across multiple clouds.
- Universality: Applications can be run in any cloud.

Typical technical components serve to standardize interfaces, enable the dynamic deployment of cloud services, and support location- and cost-aware data distribution:

Compatibility layer: This layer abstracts the services of different cloud computing providers and provides unified application programming interfaces (APIs). Open-source technologies such as Kubernetes, Docker, or Apache Spark are often used for this purpose. The goal is to reduce dependence on proprietary cloud services and enable portable, vendor-independent architectures.

Intercloud layer: Building on the compatibility layer, this layer enables the dynamic, policy-based deployment of cloud services across multiple providers. Users can usually specify criteria such as cost, location requirements (e.g., GDPR compliance), availability, or execution time. Cloud services are maintained in a central catalog under a unified naming convention and described with metadata such as provider, region, and price. This information makes it possible to take individual preferences into account when selecting and allocating services. In many cases, the intercloud layer includes a central billing system that handles payment processing without requiring end users to enter into separate contracts with each provider.

Peering mechanism: For data-intensive applications, it may be necessary to transfer large volumes of data between different cloud providers. Since downloading data (egress) is generally more expensive than uploading data (ingress), a peering mechanism takes these cost differences into account during data processing. It coordinates data distribution to suitable regions or cloud infrastructures, provided this complies with user specifications.

== History ==
The concept of sky computing emerged from research in distributed systems and cloud computing in the late 2000s. The term was first coined in a 2009 publication.

The concept was further developed by Ion Stoica and Scott Shenker of UC Berkeley in 2021. The concept of the intercloud broker is being further developed at the Sky Computing Lab at UC Berkeley. For example, the open-source library SkyPilot has emerged from this work. Companies such as OpenRouter, Cortecs, Portkey, and nexos.ai have built intercloud or gateway layers to route large language model (LLM) workloads across multiple cloud providers and model vendors.

== Criticism ==
Criticism of Sky computing revolves around challenges to its implementation, including technical obstacles, data protection and security concerns, and regulatory issues. There is also a risk that an effective market may not develop, for example due to incomplete or missing information on services and pricing, or because of aggressive pricing strategies by dominant cloud providers.
