= ESM =

ESM may refer to:

== Business and economics ==
- Election stock market
- Electronic Settlement Matching
- Elektrani na Severna Makedonija (Електрани на Северна Македонија), a power company in North Macedonia
- Enterprise Securities Market, a market of the Irish Stock Exchange
- Enterprise service management
- European Single Market
- European Stability Mechanism

== Education ==
- Eastman School of Music, in Rochester, New York, United States
- Eastport-South Manor Central School District, in New York, United States
- East Syracuse-Minoa Central School District, in New York, United States
- East Syracuse-Minoa High School, in Manlius, New York, United States
- École secondaire de Mirabel, a secondary school in Quebec, Canada
- École spéciale militaire de Saint-Cyr, a French military academy
- Emmanuel School of Mission
- Engineering science and mechanics
- European School, Munich, in Germany

== Science and technology ==
- Earth System Model
- ECMAScript Modules
- Electronic support measures
- Embedded System Module
- End System Multicast, a research project at Carnegie Mellon University
- Energy Saving Module
- Ethosuximide, an antiepileptic drug
- European Service Module, part of the Orion spacecraft
- Event sampling methodology
- Experience sampling method

== Transport ==
- Colonel Carlos Concha Torres Airport, serving Esmereldas, Ecuador
- Elsenham railway station, in England
- Essex station (Montana), a train station in the United States

== Other uses ==
- Emergency Services Medal (Australia)
- Esuma language
- Eurasian Youth Union, a Russian political organisation
- European Social Movement, a defunct neo-fascist organisation
- European Sports Media
- European Supermarket Magazine
- Extreme Speed Motorsports, an American auto racing team
