= Reynold Xin =

Computer scientist and engineer

- Education: UC Berkeley (Ph.D.); University of Toronto (BA.Sc.)
- Known for: Apache Spark, Databricks
- Scientific career
- Fields: Computer Science
- Doctoral advisor: Michael J. Franklin

Reynold Xin is a computer scientist, engineer, and entrepreneur specializing in big data, distributed systems, and cloud computing. He is a co-founder and Chief Architect of Databricks. He is best known for his work on Apache Spark, a leading open-source Big Data project. He was designer and lead developer of the GraphX, Project Tungsten, and Structured Streaming components and he co-designed DataFrames, all of which are part of the core Apache Spark distribution; he also served as the release manager for Spark's 2.0 release. He was the top cited scholar in the field of databases, according to the 2021 AI 2000 records.

== Biography ==
=== Berkeley ===
Xin started his work on the Spark open source project while he was a doctoral candidate at the AMPLab at the University of California, Berkeley. He received his Ph.D. in computer science from Berkeley, where his advisors were Michael J. Franklin and Ion Stoica.

The first research project, Shark, created a system that was able to efficiently execute SQL and advanced analytics workloads at scale. Shark won Best Demo Award at SIGMOD 2012. Shark was one of the first open source interactive SQL on Hadoop systems, with claims that it was between 10 and 100 times faster than Apache Hive. Shark was used by technology companies such as Yahoo, although it was replaced by a newer system called Spark SQL in 2014.

The second research project, GraphX, created a graph processing system on top of Spark, a general data-parallel system. GraphX at the same challenged the notion that specialized systems are necessary for graph computation. GraphX was released as an open source project and merged into Spark in 2014, as the graph processing library on Spark.

=== Databricks ===
In 2013, along with Matei Zaharia and other key Spark contributors, Xin co-founded Databricks, a venture-backed company based in San Francisco that offers data platform as a service, based on Spark.

In 2014, Xin led a team of engineers from Databricks to compete in the Sort Benchmark and won the 2014 world record in Daytona GraySort using Spark, beating the previous record held by Apache Hadoop by 30 times. Xin claimed that Spark was the fastest open source engine for sorting a petabyte of data.

While at Databricks, he also started the DataFrames project, Project Tungsten, and Structured Streaming. DataFrames has become the foundational API while Tungsten has become the new execution engine.
