= Ali Ghodsi =

Swedish computer scientist

- Ghodsi in 2021
- Born: 1978 (age 47–48); Iran
- Citizenship: American, Swedish
- Education: KTH Royal Institute of Technology (Ph.D.)
- Known for: Apache Mesos, Apache Spark, co-founding Databricks
- Title: CEO of Databricks
- Scientific career
- Fields: Computer science Artificial intelligence
- Workplaces: Databricks; UC Berkeley
- Thesis: Distributed k-ary System: Algorithms for Distributed Hash Tables (2006)
- Doctoral advisor: Seif Haridi
- Website: www.databricks.com/blog/author/ali-ghodsi

Ali Ghodsi (born 1978) is an Iranian-Swedish-American computer scientist and entrepreneur, specializing in distributed systems, big data and data management. He is a co-founder and CEO of Databricks and an adjunct professor at UC Berkeley. He co-authored several influential papers, including Apache Mesos and Apache Spark SQL. Ghodsi holds a PhD in computer science.

== Education ==
In 2002, Ghodsi received an MSc degree in computer engineering and an MBA in logistics and strategic marketing from Mid-Sweden University. In 2006, Ghodsi received his PhD in distributed computing from KTH Royal Institute of Technology in Sweden, advised by computer scientist and professor Seif Haridi.

== Career ==
Ghodsi was a co-founder of Peerialism AB, a Stockholm-based company developing a peer-to-peer data transfer system. From 2008 to 2009, Ghodis was an assistant professor at KTH.

He joined UC Berkeley in 2009 as a visiting scholar and worked with Scott Shenker, Ion Stoica, Michael Franklin, and Matei Zaharia on research projects in distributed systems, database systems, and networking. During this period, he helped start the Apache Mesos and Apache Spark projects. He also co-invented the concept of dominant resource fairness, in a paper that heavily influenced resource management and scheduling design in distributed systems such as Hadoop.

In 2013, he co-founded Databricks, an American cloud-based data analytics and artificial intelligence company that commercializes Spark, and became chief executive in 2016, after starting as the company's president of engineering. In March 2026, Ghodsi announced "Lakewatch," Databrick's cybersecurity platform. In August 2026, Ghodsi led Databricks through a $5 billion funding round, led by Coatue Management, at a $190 billion valuation.

In 2026, Ghodsi said Databricks was working on artificial intelligence agents called "Genie One" to help professionals get answers from their business data. That year, Ghodsi also introduced LTAP, an architecture that allows both transactional (or OLTP) and analytical (or OLAP) engines to operate directly on a single, open-format data copy.

In 2026, Ghodsi was named to Time 100's most influential people in artificial intelligence, with the magazine citing Databrick's 80% year-over-year growth in June 2026 under Ghodsi.

== Research Interests ==
Ghodsi's research interests include distributed systems, cloud computing, big data computing, and networking.
