= List of Romanians by net worth =

The following list of Romanians by net worth includes the 10 wealthiest Romanians individuals and families as determined by Forbes Romania. In addition to the annual rankings published by Forbes Romania, six Romanians are also featured in The World's Billionaires by Forbes.

== Annual rankings ==
These lists only show the top 10 wealthiest Romanians for each year.

=== Legend ===
Icon	Description
Steady	Has not changed from the previous ranking.
▲	Has increased from the previous ranking.
▼	Has decreased from the previous ranking.

No.	Name	Net worth (USD)	Age	Residence	Source(s) of wealth
1 ▲	Dragoș and Adrian Pavăl	$3.6 billion	56, N/A	Bacău, Romania	Dedeman
2	Daniel Dines	$1.6 billion	53	Bucharest, Romania	UiPath
3	Ion Țiriac	$1.6 billion	83	Băneasa, Romania	Țiriac Holdings
4 ▲	Ion Stoica and Matei Zaharia	$1.6 billion	57, 36	San Francisco, California, US	Databricks
5 ▲	Zoltán Teszári	$800 million	51	Oradea, Romania	Digi Communications
6 ▼	Anastasia Soare	$730 million	65	Beverly Hills, California, US	Anastasia Beverly Hills
7 ▲	Florin Talpeș & family	$600 million	65	Bucharest, Romania	Bitdefender
8 ▲	Ștefan Vuza	$502 million	52	Romania	Chimcomplex
9	Andrei Diaconescu and Victor Căpitanu	$398 million	47, 43	Romania	One United Properties
10 ▲	Iulian Stanciu	$377 million	35	Romania	eMAG

== See also ==
- Lists of people by net worth
