= Haoyuan Li =

Computer scientist

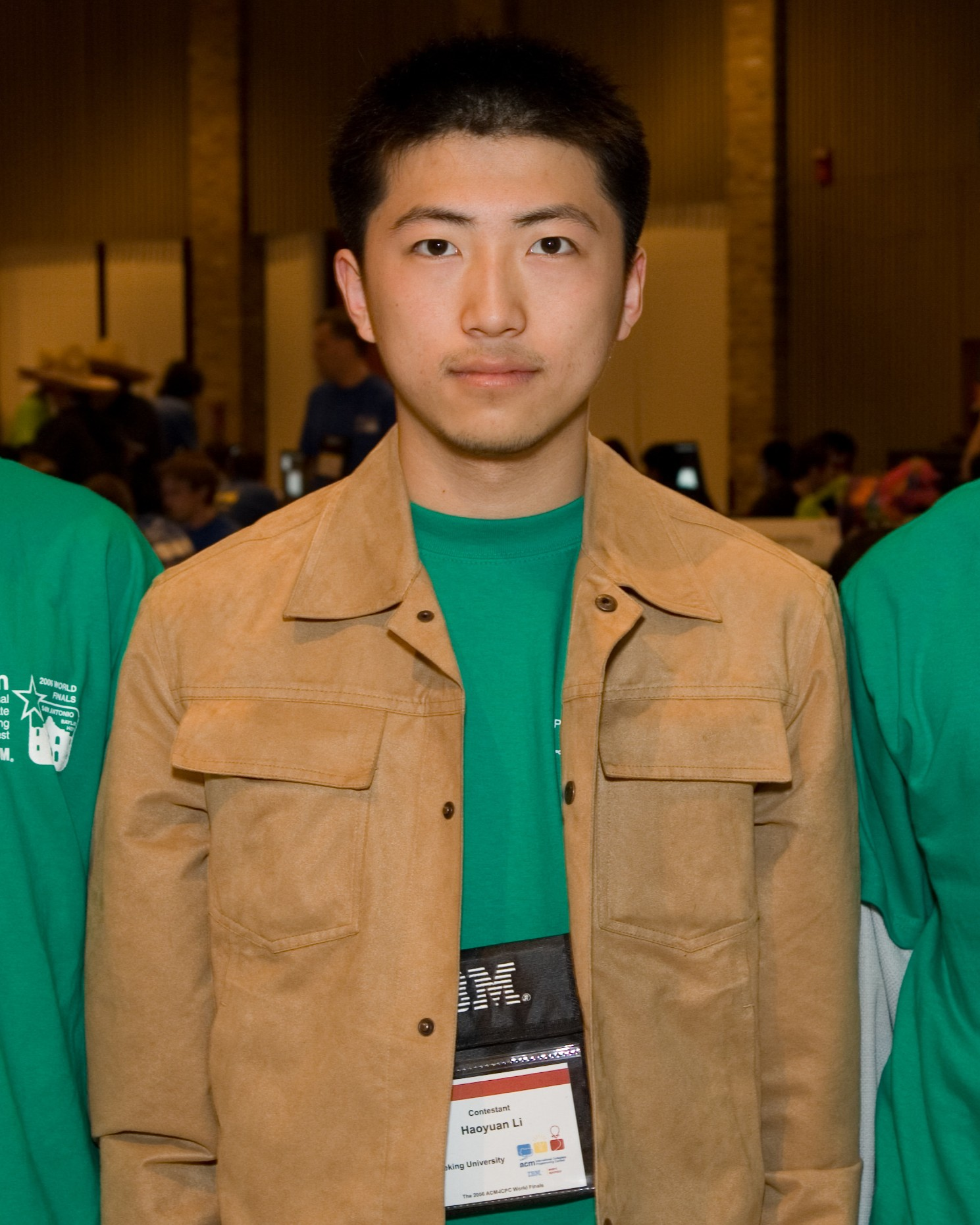
- Education: Ph.D. M.S. B.S.
- Alma mater: UC Berkeley; Cornell University; Peking University
- Known for: Alluxio
- Scientific career
- Fields: Computer Science
- Thesis: Alluxio: A Virtual Distributed File System (2018)
- Doctoral advisor: Ion Stoica; Scott Shenker
- Website: haoyuanli.com

Haoyuan "H.Y." Li is a computer scientist and entrepreneur specializing in distributed systems, big data, and cloud computing. He is best known for proposing Virtual Distributed File System (VDFS), and creating an open-source data orchestration system, Alluxio. He is the founder, chairman, and CEO of Alluxio, Inc, a company commercializing the Alluxio Data Orchestration Technology. He is also an adjunct professor at Peking University. He is a speaker on the topic of AI, big data, cloud computing, and open source.

== Biography ==
Li was born and raised in China. He attended Peking University, where he received a BS in Computer Science. While at university, he participated in programming contests representing Peking University, and placed 11th worldwide (bronze medal) in ACM ICPC 2005 and 13rd place worldwide in 2006. He then studied at Cornell University, where he received a MS in Computer Science.

He received his Computer Science PhD from the UC Berkeley AMPLab, under the supervision of Prof. Ion Stoica and Prof. Scott Shenker. During his PhD, he co-created the Alluxio (a.k.a. Tachyon) open-source project, which was commercialized by San Francisco Bay Area venture-backed company Alluxio, Inc. He was a co-founder of Alluxio, Inc.

During his PhD, he also co-created the Apache Spark Streaming project and became an Apache Spark committer.
