= Alluxio =

- Original author: Haoyuan Li
- Developer: UC Berkeley AMPLab
- Release: April 8, 2013; 13 years ago
- Stable release: v2.9.4 / June 11, 2024; 2 years ago
- Written in: Java
- Operating system: macOS, Linux
- Available in: Java
- License: Apache License 2.0
- Website: www.alluxio.io
- Repository: https://github.com/Alluxio/alluxio

Alluxio is an open-source virtual distributed file system (VDFS) positioned between compute frameworks and persistent storage. Initially as research project "Tachyon", Alluxio was created at the University of California, Berkeley's AMPLab as Haoyuan Li's Ph.D. Thesis, advised by Professor Scott Shenker & Professor Ion Stoica. Alluxio is situated between computation and storage in the big data analytics stack. It provides a data abstraction layer for computation frameworks, enabling applications to connect to numerous storage systems through a common interface. The software is published under the Apache License.

Data Driven Applications, such as Data Analytics, Machine Learning, and AI, use APIs (such as Hadoop HDFS API, S3 API, FUSE API) provided by Alluxio to interact with data from various storage systems at a fast speed. Popular frameworks running on top of Alluxio include Apache Spark, Presto, TensorFlow, Trino, Apache Hive, and PyTorch, etc.

Alluxio can be deployed on-premise, in the cloud (e.g. Microsoft Azure, AWS, Google Compute Engine), or a hybrid cloud environment. It can run on bare-metal or in containerized environments such as Kubernetes, Docker, Apache Mesos.

== History ==
Alluxio was initially started by Haoyuan Li at UC Berkeley's AMPLab in 2013, and open sourced in 2014. Alluxio had in excess of 1000 contributors in 2018, making it one of the most active projects in the data eco-system.

Version	Original release date	Latest version	Release date
0.2	2013-04-08	0.2.1	2013-04-25
0.3	2013-10-21	0.3.0	2013-10-21
0.4	2014-02-02	0.4.1	2014-02-25
0.5	2014-07-20	0.5.0	2014-07-20
0.6	2015-03-01	0.6.4	2015-04-23
0.7	2015-07-17	0.7.1	2015-08-10
0.8	2015-10-21	0.8.2	2015-11-10
1.0	2016-02-23	1.0.1	2016-03-27
1.1	2016-06-06	1.1.1	2016-07-04
1.2	2016-07-17	1.2.0	2016-07-17
1.3	2016-10-05	1.3.0	2016-10-05
1.4	2017-01-12	1.4.0	2017-01-12
1.5	2017-06-11	1.5.0	2017-06-11
1.6	2017-09-24	1.6.1	2017-11-02
1.7	2018-01-14	1.7.1	2018-03-26
1.8	2018-07-07	1.8.2	2019-08-05
2.0	2019-06-27	2.0.1	2019-09-03
2.1	2019-11-06	2.1.2	2020-02-04
2.2	2020-03-11	2.2.2	2020-06-24
2.3	2020-06-30	2.3.0	2020-06-30
2.4	2020-10-19	2.4.1	2020-11-20
2.5	2021-03-10	2.5.0	2021-03-10
2.6	2021-06-23	2.6.2	2021-09-17
2.7	2021-11-16	2.7.4	2022-04-19
2.8	2022-05-04	2.8.1	2022-08-17
2.9	2022-11-16	2.9.3	2023-03-27
Legend: Unsupported Supported Latest version Preview version

== Enterprises that use Alluxio ==
The following is a list of notable enterprises that have used or are using Alluxio:

- Baidu
- Barclays
- China Unicom
- Comcast
- Cray
- DiDi Chuxing
- DBS Bank
- Esri
- Huawei
- IBM
- Intel
- JD.com
- Lenovo
- Samsung
- Tencent
- Vipshop
- Wells Fargo

== See also ==
- Clustered file system
- Comparison of distributed file systems
- Global Namespace
- List of file systems
