= Holden Karau =

American-Canadian computer programmer, author, and open source evangelist (born 1986)

- Born: October 4, 1986 (age 40)
- Known for: Open source, Apache Spark
- Website: holdenkarau.com

Holden Karau (born October 4, 1986) is an American-Canadian computer scientist and author based in San Francisco, CA. She is best known for her work on Apache Spark, her advocacy in the open-source software movement, and her creation and maintenance of a variety of related projects including spark-testing-base. In addition to her work on big data she co-founded Fight Health Insurance, an early AI tool to help people appeal insurance denials. She is also a member of The Apache Software Foundation.

== Apache Spark ==
Holden is best known for her work on Apache Spark where she is a member of the PMC. In 2016, she was recognized for her work on Apache Spark by the Google Open Source Peer Bonus Program. She was also included in the Faces of Open Source work in recognition of her work in the open-source community.

== Author ==
Holden has written a number of books on technology including:

- Fast Data Processing With Spark
- Learning Spark
- High Performance Spark
- Kubeflow for Machine Learning
- Scaling Python with Dask
- Scaling Python with Ray
