= Immuta =

American data security software company

Immuta, Inc.
- Company type: Private
- Industry: Data security
- Founded: 2015
- Founder: Matt Carroll; Steven Touw; Mike Schiller
- Headquarters: Boston, Massachusetts, United States

Immuta Inc. is an American data security platform and software company. The company provides a cloud-native data governance platform to businesses, governmental agencies, and healthcare organizations.

== History ==
Founded by a former U.S. Army intelligence officer, Matt Carroll, and co-founded by Steven Touw and Mike Schiller in 2015, Immuta is headquartered in Boston, Massachusetts. The company also has offices in College Park, Maryland; Columbus, and London, England.

== Product features ==
Immuta's software works with various cloud computing services, including Databricks, Snowflake, Amazon, Google, and Starburst.

In 2022, Immuta released its latest product enhancements and integrations designed to deliver data security and monitoring across key cloud platforms at scale. The features include native integration with Google BigQuery, expanded integrations with Snowflake, including external OAuth support, audit log data export into Amazon S3, and better policy onboarding for Databricks.

In October 2025, Immuta introduced new data provisioning capabilities aimed at automating and accelerating access to governed data for analytics, applications, and AI agents. The updates included features such as Guardrail Policies for automated governance controls, a Policy Exception Workflow for structured access requests, a Multi-Approver Setup for policy automation, and the general availability of Immuta Marketplace, a governed hub for discovering and provisioning data assets.

== Partnerships ==
In 2021, Okta, Inc., an American identity and access management company, partnered with Immuta.

In 2022, Immuta entered into a partnership with Nordic-Baltic-based banking group Swedbank. Immuta has also worked with Billie, the Berlin-based FinTech company.
