= Mesosphere (disambiguation) =

The mesosphere is the region of Earth's atmosphere directly above the stratosphere, and directly below the mesopause.

Mesosphere may also refer to:

- Lower mantle, the region of the Earth's mantle that was historically known as "the mesospheric shell" and is located directly above the outer core
- Mesosphere (software), a data center operating system based on Apache Mesos, and a company by the same name
