= Michael J. Carey =

Michael J. Carey may refer to:

- Michael Carey (United States Air Force officer), American entrepreneur and officer
- Michael J. Carey (computer scientist), American computer scientist
