= Unity Catalog =

Open-source data and AI governance catalog

- Developer: Unity Catalog community (LF AI & Data Foundation)
- Release: June 12, 2024; 2 years ago (open source)
- Stable release: 0.6.0 / August 20, 2026; 44 days ago
- Written in: Java, Python, TypeScript, Scala
- Operating system: Cross-platform
- Type: Metadata catalog, data governance
- License: Apache License 2.0
- Website: www.unitycatalog.io
- Repository: github.com/unitycatalog/unitycatalog

Unity Catalog is a metadata and governance catalog for data and artificial intelligence assets, released under the Apache License. It includes a unified namespace for tables, unstructured data volumes, and functions, with APIs that can be accessed with multiple compute engines. It also manages table formats including Delta Lake and Apache Iceberg. The source code for the project is part of the LF AI & Data Foundation, an open source nonprofit software foundation. The catalog was originally developed at Databricks, which also offers it as a managed service.

== Overview ==
Unity Catalog works by organizing data and AI assets in a hierarchical namespace consisting of catalogs, schemas, and other securable objects. It manages structured tables, supporting formats such as Delta Lake, Apache Iceberg, Apache Parquet, CSV, and JSON; and unstructured data through volumes; and machine-learning assets such as functions and models.

The governance features in the project include credential vending, a feature where the catalog server issues scoped credentials to clients accessing underlying cloud storage, and support for the Apache Iceberg REST Catalog API and Apache Hive metastore API. By acting as a layer that exposes open APIs, implementation provides an interface for external clients, such as engines like Apache Spark to read tables, volumes, and functions that are managed by the catalog.

Unity Catalog leverages an OpenAPI-based REST specification and an reference server, with client libraries and SDKs. The server is compatible with the popular Apache Iceberg REST Catalog and provides compatibility with the Apache Hive metastore API.

== See also ==
- Delta Lake
- Apache Iceberg
- Data lakehouse
- Metadata management
