= Genomics in the Azure Cloud =

Technical book on Cloud Genomics

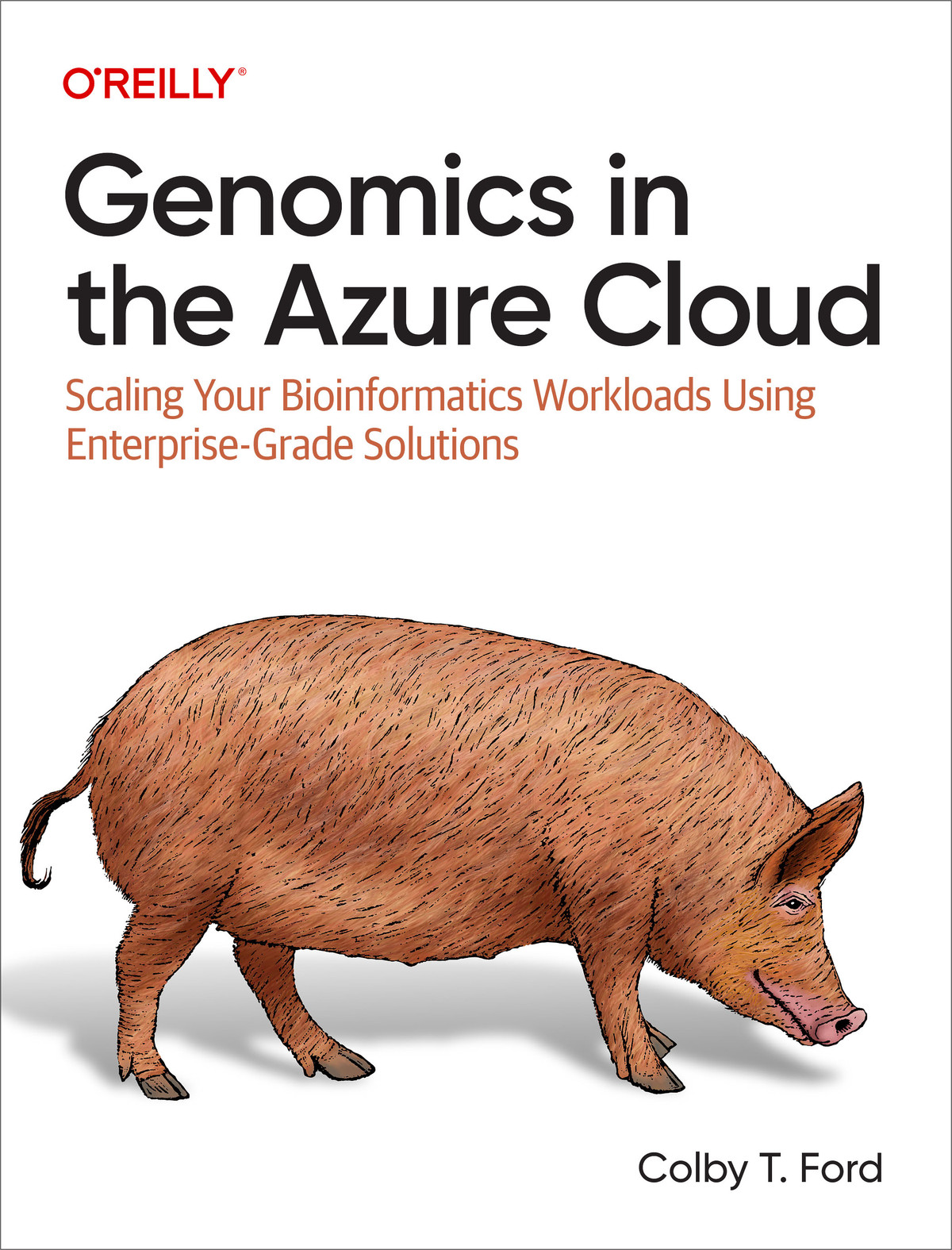
- First edition cover
- Author: Colby T. Ford
- Language: English
- Subject: Bioinformatics, genomics, cloud computing, Microsoft Azure
- Genre: Technical literature
- Publisher: O'Reilly Media
- Publication date: November 2022
- Publication place: United States
- Media type: Print, e-book
- Pages: 327
- ISBN: 978-1098139049
- OCLC: 1350353594

Genomics in the Azure Cloud: Scaling Your Bioinformatics Workloads Using Enterprise-Grade Solutions is a 2022 technical book by Colby T. Ford, published by O'Reilly Media. The book focuses on the use of Microsoft Azure for genomics and bioinformatics workloads, covering topics including cloud architecture, data lakes, distributed computing, workflow orchestration, machine learning, and high-performance computing for genomic data analysis.

== Background ==
The book was written to bridge cloud computing concepts in Microsoft Azure with practical applications in computational biology and genomics. It introduces readers to Azure services commonly used in bioinformatics workflows and demonstrates how cloud-native architectures can be applied to large-scale genomic analysis.

== Contents ==
The book is organized into chapters covering:

- Cloud computing fundamentals and Azure architecture
- Organizing genomics data using Azure Data Lake Storage
- Querying genomic variant data with SQL and Azure Synapse Analytics
- Workflow orchestration using Azure Data Factory
- Distributed computing with Azure Databricks and Apache Spark
- Machine learning using Azure Machine Learning
- High-performance computing for bioinformatics
- Security, compliance, deployment, and cost management

Throughout the book, practical examples illustrate how Azure services can be integrated into genomics workflows and enterprise bioinformatics pipelines.

== Themes ==
The book explores several recurring themes, including:

- Scalable cloud infrastructure for genomics
- Data engineering for biological datasets
- Reproducible bioinformatics workflows
- Enterprise cloud architecture
- Machine learning applications in genomics

Rather than serving as a textbook in molecular biology, it focuses on the engineering and computational aspects of modern genomic data analysis.

== Publication ==
Genomics in the Azure Cloud was published by O'Reilly Media in November 2022 in print and electronic formats. The book contains 327 pages and is intended for intermediate to advanced readers with backgrounds in bioinformatics, software engineering, data engineering, or cloud computing.

== Related presentations ==
Following its publication, material from Genomics in the Azure Cloud was presented at several professional conferences and educational events, including:

- A presentation at the Nextflow Summit 2024 titled Building Enterprise-Grade Bioinformatics Pipelines using Cloud-Scale Kubernetes.
- A webinar discussing cloud-native genomics workflows hosted by Manning Publications.
- A seminar for the Boston Protein Design and Modeling Club, an academic and industry community based in the Boston area.

== See also ==
- Bioinformatics
- Computational biology
- Genomics
- Microsoft Azure
- Cloud computing
- Apache Spark
- High-performance computing
