= Ion Stoica =

Romanian–American computer scientist

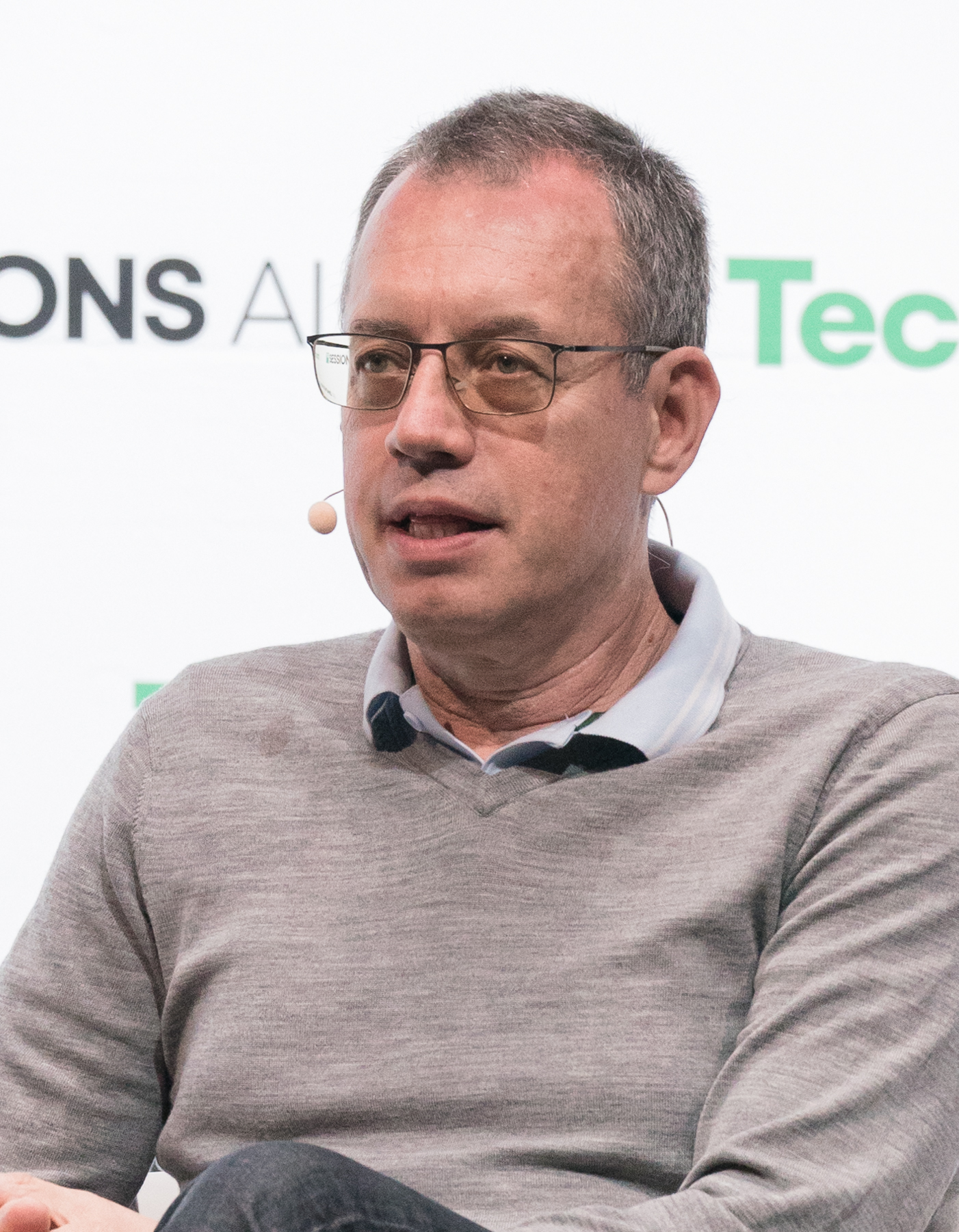
- Stoica in 2025
- Born: Ion Stoica; 1964 or 1965 (age 61–62)
- Citizenship: Romanian, American
- Education: Carnegie Mellon University
- Known for: Chord; Apache Spark; Apache Mesos; Alluxio
- Awards: ACM Fellow; SIGOPS Mark Weiser Award
- Scientific career
- Fields: Cloud computing; Networking; Distributed systems; Big data
- Workplaces: University of California, Berkeley; Databricks; Conviva
- Thesis: Stateless Core: A Scalable Approach for Quality of Service in the Internet (2000)
- Doctoral advisor: Hui Zhang
- Doctoral students: Boon Thau Loo; Haoyuan Li; Matei Zaharia; Sylvia Ratnasamy; Mosharaf Chowdhury
- Website: www.cs.berkeley.edu/~istoica

Ion Stoica (born 1964 or 1965) is a Romanian–American computer scientist specializing in distributed systems, cloud computing and computer networking. He is a professor of computer science at the University of California, Berkeley and co-director of AMPLab. He co-founded Conviva and Databricks with other original developers of Apache Spark and Anyscale with other original developers of Ray.

In 2026, Forbes ranked him and Matei Zaharia as the richest Romanians, with a net worth of $5 billion each.

== Education ==
Stoica was born in Romania, where he grew up and attended Polytechnic University of Bucharest, receiving a MS in Electrical Engineering and Computer Science in 1989. He moved to the U.S. in 1994 to start a PhD at Old Dominion University with computer-science professor Hussein Abdel-Wahab. Together with Wahab, in 1995 he published the algorithm for earliest eligible virtual deadline first scheduling, which is the current process scheduler in the Linux kernel. In 1996, he transferred to Carnegie Mellon University (CMU), where in 2000 he received a PhD in Electrical & Computer Engineering supervised by Hui Zhang. Subjects included Chord (peer-to-peer), Core-Stateless Fair Queueing (CSFQ), and Internet Indirection Infrastructure (i3).

== Career and research ==
Stoica has been a Berkeley professor since 2000. His research interests include cloud computing, networking, distributed systems and big data. He has authored or co-authored more than 100 peer reviewed papers in various areas of computer science.

Stoica was a co-founder and Chief Technology Officer (CTO) of Conviva in 2006, a company that came out of the End System Multicast project at CMU. In 2013 he co-founded Databricks, along with Ali Ghodsi, Matei Zaharia, Patrick Wendell, Reynold Xin, Andy Konwinski, and Arsalan Tavakoli-Shiraji, serving as its chief executive until being replaced by Ali Ghodsi in January 2016, when he became executive chairman.

He is one of the inventors of dominant resource fairness.

=== Awards ===
Stoica under the supervision of his doctoral advisor Hui Zhang won the Association for Computing Machinery Ph.D. dissertation Award in 2001 for his thesis Stateless Core: A Scalable Approach for Quality of Service in the Internet (2000). Stoica is the recipient of a SIGCOMM Test of Time Award (2011), the 2007 CoNEXT Rising Star Award, a Sloan Foundation Fellowship (2003) and a PECASE Award (2002). Stoica is also an ACM Fellow. In 2019, Stoica received the SIGOPS Mark Weiser Award.

=== Philanthropy ===
In June 2021, Berkeley announced that Stoica had donated $25 million toward the university's computing and data science initiatives, making him and colleague Scott Shenker two of Berkeley's largest benefactors.

== Publications ==
- List of publications, Berkeley website
