= Michael J. Franklin =

American computer scientist

- Citizenship: United States
- Education: University of Wisconsin-Madison (Ph.D.), Wang Institute of Graduate Studies (Master), University of Massachusetts Amherst (Bachelor)
- Scientific career
- Fields: Computer Science
- Workplaces: University of Chicago; University of California Berkeley
- Thesis: Caching and memory management in client-server database systems (1993)
- Doctoral advisor: Michael James Carey
- Website: cs.uchicago.edu/directory/michael-franklin

Michael Jay Franklin is an American software entrepreneur and computer scientist specializing in distributed and streaming database technology. He is Liew Family Chair of Computer Science and chairman for the Department of Computer Science at the University of Chicago.

Franklin was the top cited scholar in the field of databases, according to the 2022 AI 2000 records.

== Biography ==
Before moving to Chicago in 2016, he was Thomas M. Siebel Professor of Computer Science and chair of the Computer Science Division at University of California, Berkeley. At Berkeley he was director of the Algorithms, Machines, and People Laboratory (AMPLab), a collaboration of computing systems, data management, machine learning researchers focused on large-scale data analytics. Under his direction, AMPLab projects such as Spark and Mesos had wide industrial and academic impact.

Franklin received a bachelor's degree from the University of Massachusetts Amherst in 1983 and a master's degree from the Wang Institute of Graduate Studies in 1986. He earned a Ph.D. from the University of Wisconsin–Madison in 1993 under with his thesis Caching and memory management in client-server database systems under Michael James Carey.

He was also a cofounder as well as CTO of Truviso, a company specializing in streaming databases which was acquired by Cisco in May 2012. He is also an advisor to Databricks, a big data company commercializing the Spark research project.

== Awards ==
- Elected to the American Academy of Arts and Sciences, 2023
- AAAS Fellow, 2021
- Inaugural University of Massachusetts Amherst CS Department Outstanding Achievement Award in Research, 2009
- ACM Fellow, 2005, "for contributions to distributed information management."
- SIGMOD Test of Time Award, 2004
