= Mosharaf Chowdhury =

Bangladeshi-American computer scientist

- Education: University of California, Berkeley, Bangladesh University of Engineering and Technology
- Awards: NSF CAREER Award; ACM SIGCOMM Doctoral Dissertation Award
- Scientific career
- Workplaces: University of Michigan, Ann Arbor
- Thesis: Coflow: A Networking Abstraction for Distributed Data-Parallel Applications (2015)
- Doctoral advisor: Ion Stoica
- Website: www.mosharaf.com

Mosharaf Chowdhury is a Bangladeshi-American computer scientist known for his contributions to the fields of computer networking and large-scale systems for emerging machine learning and big data workloads. He is an associate professor of Computer Science and Engineering at the University of Michigan, Ann Arbor and leads SymbioticLab. He is the creator of coflow and the co-creator of Apache Spark.

== Research ==
Chowdhury specializes in the fields of computer networking and large-scale systems for emerging machine learning and big data workloads. Especially, his research aims for the symbiosis of AI/ML applications and software/hardware infrastructure in wide-area, datacenter-scale, and rack-scale computing.

Chowdhury pioneered many fields of research and technology in the context of emerging workloads and computer systems. Chowdhury created Infiniswap, the first practical memory disaggregation system, Salus, a software-only GPU sharing system for deep learning, FedScale, the largest federated learning benchmark and platform, and Zeus, the first GPU time & energy optimization framework for deep learning.
