= Truviso =

Truviso Corporation
- Industry: Software
- Founded: 2006
- Headquarters: Foster City, California, USA
- Key people: Michael J. Franklin; Sailesh Krishnamurthy; Kim MacPherson

Truviso (pronounced true-VEE-so) is a continuous analytics, venture-backed, startup headquartered in Foster City, California developing and supporting its solution leveraging PostgreSQL, to deliver a proprietary analytics solutions for net-centric customers. Truviso was acquired by Cisco Systems, Inc. on May 4, 2012.

== History ==
Truviso was founded in 2006 by UC Berkeley professor Michael J. Franklin and his Ph.D. student Sailesh Krishnamurthy, advancing on the research of Berkeley's Telegraph project.

Truviso's TruCQ product leverages and extends the open source PostgreSQL database to enable analysis of streaming data, including queries that combine those streams with other streaming data or with historical/staged data. One public example of Truviso's customers using continuous analytics is the dynamic tag cloud visualization of blog indexer Technorati.

Truviso is one of the pioneers in the continuous analytics space which seeks to alter how business intelligence is done—rather than accumulating data first and then running queries on the data set stored in a relational database or a data warehouse, Truviso has always-on queries which process streaming data as it arrives, continuously. For many queries this approach yields results hundreds or thousands of times faster and more efficiently.

Truviso has received funding from ONSET Ventures, Diamondhead Ventures, and the UPS Strategic Enterprise Fund.

Truviso was acquired by Cisco on May 4, 2012.

== Technology ==
Truviso's analytics approach is to have always-on queries analyzing streaming data. This strategy for handling continuously flowing data is different from traditional business intelligence approaches of first accumulating data and then running batch queries for reporting and analysis.

Truviso has developed a continuous analytics solution to solve the challenges of high-volume, always-on data analysis. Truviso's solution is based on a scalable PostgreSQL platform capable of concurrent query execution, utilizing standard SQL against live streams of data. Truviso's approach enables analysis of heterogeneous data regardless of whether the data is flowing, staged, or some combination of the two.

- Queries are continuous and always running so new results are delivered when the downstream application or use require them
- Data does not need to be stored or modified, so the system can keep up with enormous data volumes
- Thousands of concurrent queries can be run continuously and simultaneously on a single server
- Queries can be run over both real-time and historical data
- Incoming data can be optionally persisted for replay, backtesting, drill-down, or benchmarking

On May 4, 2010, Truviso announced that the company developed a specific application for web analytics called Visitor Insight & Analytics.

== See also ==
- Streaming Media List of streaming media companies
- Event Stream Processing (ESP) is technology that focuses on processing streams of related data.
- Event Driven Architecture (EDA) software architecture pattern promoting the production, detection, consumption of, and reaction to events.
- Real-time business intelligence Application of business intelligence to dynamic, real-time business processes
- Real-time computing CEP systems are typically real-time systems
- Operational Intelligence Both CEP and ESP are technologies that underpin operational intelligence.
