= Michael J. Carey (computer scientist) =

American computer scientist

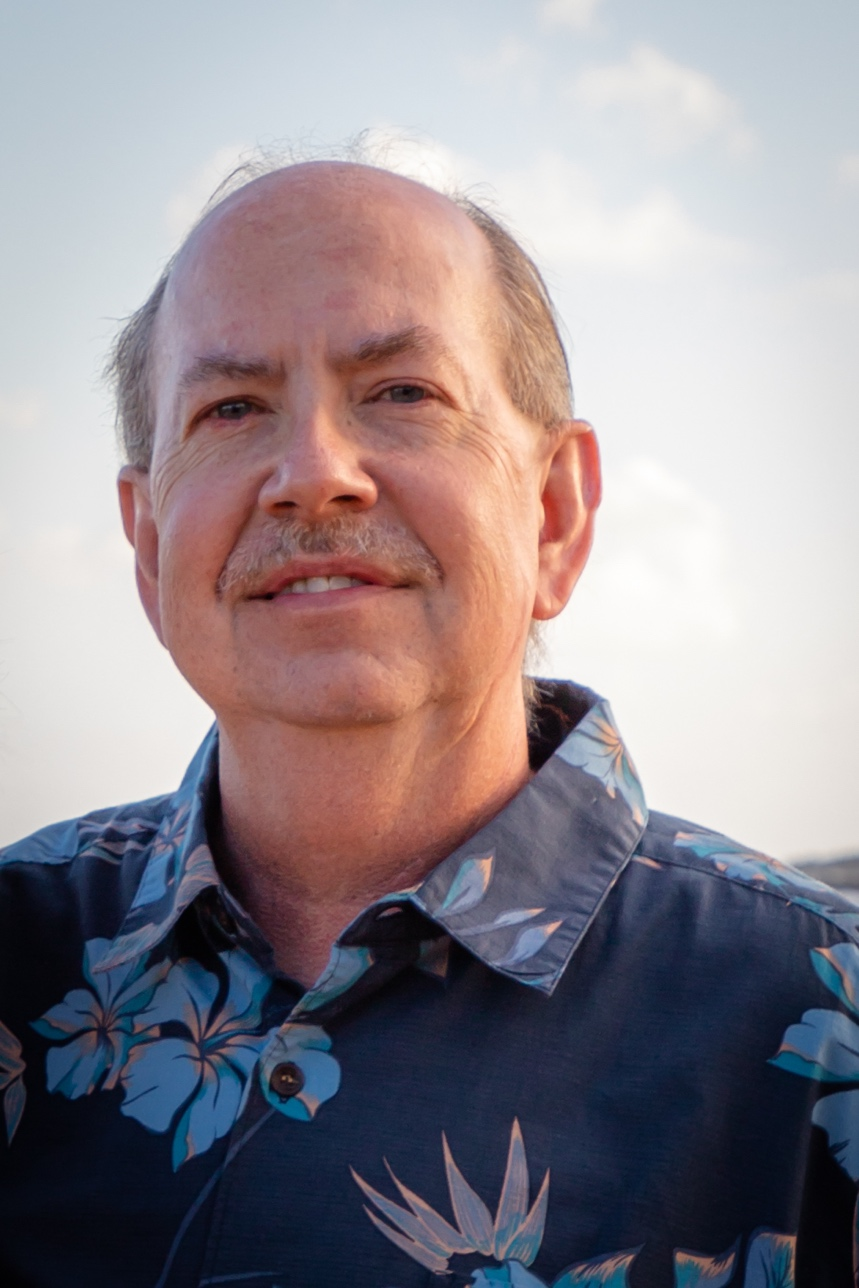
- Education: Carnegie Mellon University (B.S. 1979; M.S. 1981); University of California, Berkeley (Ph.D. 1983)
- Awards: IEEE Fellow (2017); IEEE TCDE CSEE Impact Award (2016); Chancellor’s Award for Excellence in Fostering Undergraduate Research, UC Irvine (2010); SIGMOD Edgar F. Codd Innovations Award (2005); ACM SIGMOD Conference Test of Time Paper Award (2004); Member, National Academy of Engineering (2002); Distinguished Alumnus Award, EECS Department, UC Berkeley (2002); ACM Fellow (2000)
- Scientific career
- Fields: Computer science, Databases
- Workplaces: University of California, Irvine (2008); BEA Systems (later Oracle Corporation) (2001); Propel Software Corporation (2000); IBM Research, Almaden Research Center (1995); University of Wisconsin–Madison, Computer Sciences Department (1983)
- Doctoral advisor: Michael Stonebraker
- Doctoral students: Michael J. Franklin; Jayant R. Haritsa

Michael James Carey is an American computer scientist. He is currently a Distinguished Professor (Emeritus) of Computer Science in the Donald Bren School at the University of California, Irvine and a Consulting Architect at Couchbase, Inc..

== Education ==
Carey earned his Ph.D. in Computer Science from the University of California at Berkeley in 1983. He also holds a M.S. in Electrical Engineering (Computer Engineering) from Carnegie-Mellon University (earned 1981) and a B.S. (University Honors) in Electrical Engineering and Mathematics from Carnegie-Mellon University (earned 1979). He added an A.A. in Music to his educational history in 2019.

== Life and career ==
From 1983 to 1995, Carey taught in the Computer Sciences Department at the University of Wisconsin-Madison. After which, he worked as Research Staff Member/Manager at IBM Almaden Research Center in San Jose, California.

Carey was elected a member of the National Academy of Engineering in 2002 for contributions to the design, implementation, and evaluation of database systems.

He joined the faculty of the University of California, Irvine in 2008 as a Donald Bren Professor of Computer and Information Sciences. Since 2015 Carey has served as a Consulting Chief Architect at Couchbase, Inc. Carey has published over 200 research papers, journal articles, book chapters and other publications that primarily focus on Big Data management, database management systems, information integration, middleware, parallel and distributed systems, and computer system performance evaluation.

== Awards and honors ==
- Fellow, Institute for Electrical and Electronic Engineers (IEEE), 2017.
- IEEE TCDE Computer Science, Engineering, and Education (CSEE) Impact Award, 2016.
- Chancellor's Award for Excellence in Fostering Undergraduate Research, UC Irvine, 2010.
- ACM SIGMOD Edgar F. Codd Innovations Award, 2005.
- Test of Time Paper Award, ACM SIGMOD Conference, 2004.
- Member, National Academy of Engineering, 2002.
- Distinguished Alumnus Award, EECS Department, UC Berkeley, 2002.
- Fellow, Association for Computing Machinery (ACM), 2000.

== Patents ==
Carey holds 11 patents in the United States.
