= Conviva =

US software company

Conviva is a venture-backed, privately held company, offering services for online video optimization and online video analytics. Conviva is headquartered in Silicon Valley with offices in New York and London.

== History ==
The company was founded as Rinera Networks in 2006 by Hui Zhang and Ion Stoica. The company changed its name from Rinera Networks to Conviva in April 2008.

In 2012, Conviva won AlwaysOn Global 250 top private innovative technology companies. $15 million was raised from Time Warner Investments in February 2012.

In 2013, Conviva raised $44 million from Foundation Capital, GGV, and New Enterprise Associates.

In 2017, Conviva raised $40 million, with participation from investors such as Future Fund, NEA, Foundation Capital, and Time Warner Investments.

== Technology ==
Conviva sells an operational data platform said to preemptively locate video streaming issues and make adjustments to avoid buffering and low quality. The company also provides online video analytics on viewer engagement and video performance.

In February 2013, Conviva launched a Viewer Experience Report, analyzing 22.6 billion streams globally throughout 2012; the report discovered that 39.9% of their customer’s online video streams experienced buffering in 2012. The data showed that, on average, audiences watch 250% more video when there is lower buffering, quicker start time, and higher bitrate.

In 2013, Conviva analyzed global data from 45 billion video streams, seen across more than 1.6 billion individual devices and on more than 400 premium media video players.

== Partners ==
Conviva works with media brands including HBO, ESPN, AEG, Vevo, NBC, Turner, Disney, Yahoo, Sky, and Hulu. The company has worked on live streaming events including the World Cup, Super Bowl, 2010 Vancouver Winter Olympics, March Madness, Wimbledon, and The Masters. In February 2013, Conviva announced a six-year agreement with HBO Go to provide data and video delivery optimization for their TV Everywhere platform.

Conviva has partnerships with leading Online Video Platform (OVP) companies including Brightcove and thePlatform. Conviva also partners with content delivery networks (CDN) including Limelight Networks.
