= Sigma (analytics company) =

American analytics and business intelligence company

- Type: Private
- Industry: Analytics; Business intelligence
- Founded: 2014; 11 years ago
- Founders: Jason Frantz; Rob Woollen
- Headquarters: San Francisco, California, United States
- Number of employees: 537 (Feb. 2025, U.S. only)
- Website: sigmacomputing.com

Sigma is an American cloud-based analytics and business intelligence company. Sigma was founded in 2014 by Jason Frantz and Rob Woollen.

== History ==
Sigma was founded in 2014 in California by Jason Frantz and Rob Woollen under the name Bitmoon Computing. That same year, the company raised an $8 million Series A funding round. At some point in time, the company changed its name from Bitmoon Computing to Sigma Computing.

In 2018, the company launched analytics and business intelligence services for cloud data storage. That year, Sigma raised $20 million in a Series B funding round from Sutter Hill Ventures and Altimeter Capita and moved its headquarters to San Francisco’s financial district.

In 2019, Sigma was named to CNBC's Upstart 100 list. The company also released modeling and lineage features and accepted additional funding from Sutter Hill Ventures and Altimeter Capital, bringing its total funding to $58 million.

In 2020, Sigma was recognized as a Best Place to Work by the San Francisco Business Times and Inc. magazine.

In 2021, it raised $300 million in a Series C funding round led by D1 Capital Partners.

In 2023, the company was named Snowflake Business Intelligence Partner of the Year by Snowflake. In 2024, the company shortened its name to Sigma. That year, it raised a $200 million Series D round.

In 2025, Sigma was included in the Gartner Magic Quadrant for Analytics and Business Intelligence. That year, the company surpassed $100 million in annual recurring revenue and achieved a valuation of $1.5 billion, having raised a total of $560 million to date. Also, Sigma was named Snowflake and Databricks' partners of the year.

In 2026 Sigma announced support for Apache OSSIE by releasing a bi-directional convertor.
