= Hui Zhang (computer scientist) =

Chinese-American computer scientist

Hui Zhang (Chinese: 张晖) is a Chinese-American computer scientist and professor at Carnegie Mellon University, and an entrepreneur who co-founded Conviva.

== Education ==
Zhang received a B.S. in computer science from Peking University in 1988, an M.S. in computer engineering from Rensselaer Polytechnic Institute in 1989, and a Ph.D. in computer science from the University of California, Berkeley in 1993 under Domenico Ferrari with a thesis titled Service Disciplines for Integrated Services Packet-Switching Networks.

== Career ==
Zhang, together with Ion Stoica, Aditya Ganjam, and Jibin Zhan, co-founded Conviva, where he is chief scientist and chairman of the board.

Zhang's research focus is in Internet QoE, video streaming, network architecture, and real-time big data analytics. Zhang's End System Multicast (ESM) project pioneered the overlay multicast architecture and developed the world's first peer-to-peer live streaming system. The ESM paper published in year 2000 won the ACM SIGMETRICS Test of Time Award in year 2011. His 4D research project advocated the network control architecture that separates control logic from data devices, and was the precursor to the Software Defined Networks (SDN) initiative. The 4D paper published in year 2005 won the ACM SIGCOMM Test of Time Award in year 2015.

As a professor, Zhang has mentored many students. He supervised Ion Stoica's Ph.D. dissertation, which won ACM Dissertation Award in 2001. He co-advised, with Vyas Sekar (a former student of his), Junchen Jiang's PhD thesis, which won the 2017 Carnegie Mellon University School of Computer Science Distinguished Dissertation Award.

Zhang was elected to be a Fellow of ACM in 2005 and received the Alfred Sloan Fellowship in 2000. He received the National Science Foundation Career Award in 1996 and held the Finmeccanica Chair in Computer Science at CMU from 1998 to 2001.
