= Daniel Dines =

Romanian entrepreneur (born 1972)

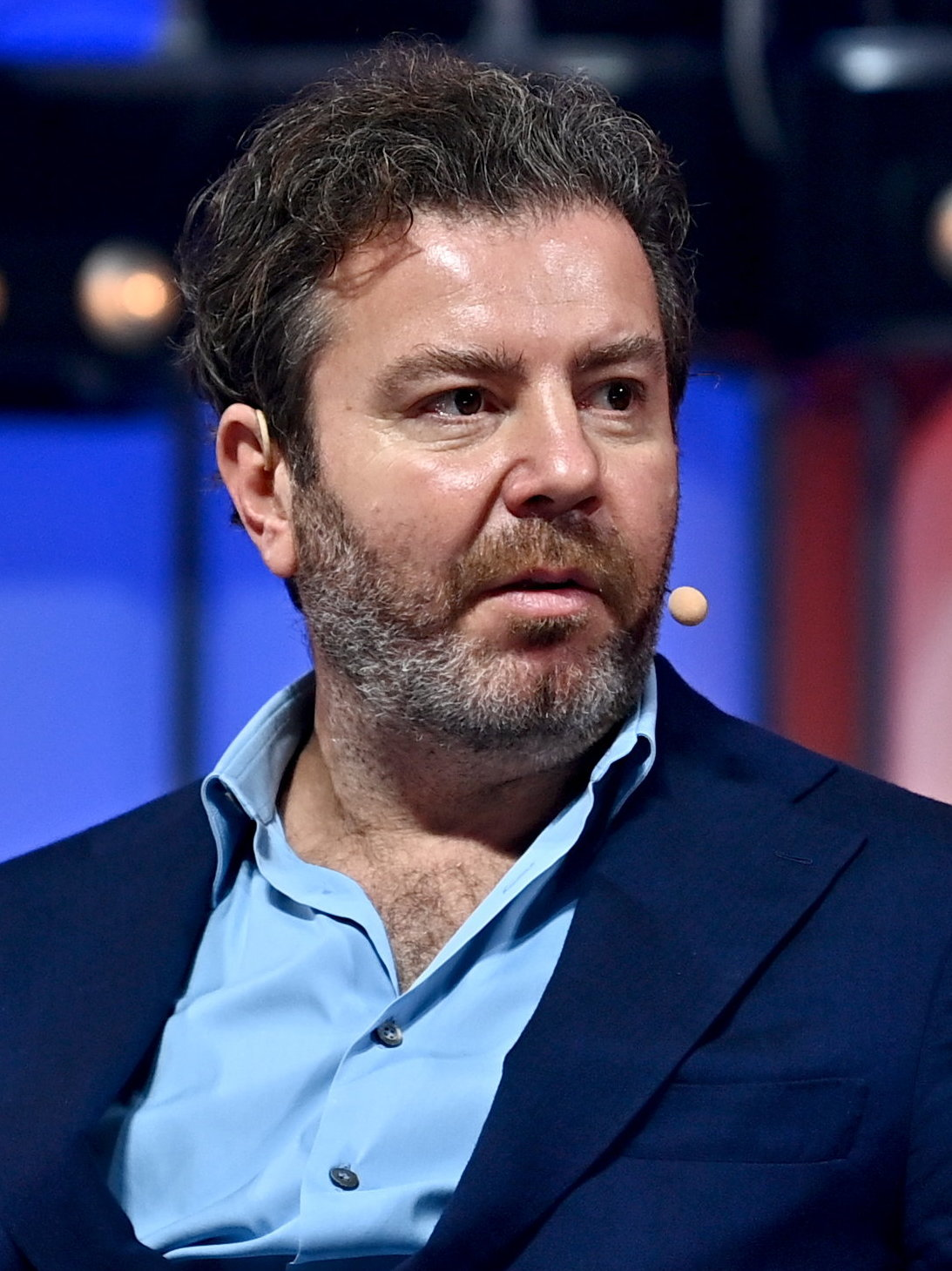
- Dines in 2021
- Born: Daniel Solomon Dines; January 1972 (age 54); Onești, Romania
- Education: University of Bucharest
- Occupation: Businessman
- Known for: Co-founder, executive chairman and chief innovation officer, UiPath
- Spouse: Alexandra Dines
- Children: 1

Daniel Solomon Dines (born January 1972) is a Romanian billionaire entrepreneur, and the co-founder and executive chairman of UiPath, a robotic process automation platform. Forbes nicknamed him the Boss of the Bots, becoming the first bot billionaire.

As of July 2025, Dines was one of the wealthiest people in Romania, with an estimated net worth of US$1.5 billion.

== Early life ==
Dines' father was an engineer and his mother a teacher. Dines earned a degree from the University of Bucharest. He was a self-taught programmer.

== Career ==
Dines worked for Microsoft in Seattle, Washington, US, from 2000 to 2005, then later returned to Romania. Dines started DeskOver in 2005 in Bucharest, Romania, and later renamed it UiPath and moved its headquarters to New York City in 2018. He has stated that he wanted UiPath to be a kind of Romanian Google or Facebook.

== Philanthropy ==
In April 2019, Dines donated €1 million to help rebuild Notre-Dame.
