= Peak (company) =

British artificial intelligence company

- Type: Privately held company
- Industry: Artificial intelligence
- Founded: 2015; 11 years ago in Manchester, England
- Founder: Richard Potter; David Leitch; Atul Sharma
- Headquarters: Manchester, England
- Number of locations: 3
- Owner: UiPath
- Website: peak.ai

Peak is a British multinational artificial intelligence company based in Manchester, England. Founded in 2015, it has additional offices in Jaipur, India, and New York City, United States.

The firm is known for its artificial intelligence platform, a SaaS platform that allows data scientists to build AI workflows, invoke them on ingested data and expose the results via APIs and/or built-in web applications, as well as abstracting the underlying cloud infrastructure.

== History ==
The company was founded by CEO Richard Potter, David Leitch and Atul Sharma. In 2015, Peak was one of the winners of the Tech North Northern Stars competition.

In 2017, it secured £2.5 million in Series A capital funding from MMC Ventures for investment in machine learning and artificial intelligence technologies.

In 2018, it was chosen to work as part of Arsenal F.C.'s Innovation Lab.

In April 2020, the company raised $12 million in extended series A funding, which is required to sustain its growth, commercial expansion, and R&D efforts.

In February 2021, Peak announced a $21 million Series B funding round – led by investors Oxx, Praetura Ventures, MMC Ventures and Arete – to further make AI accessible to non-tech companies. In August, it announced a $75 million Series C funding round, led by SoftBank Vision Fund 2.

In March 2025, Peak was acquired by UiPath software company.
