= Couchbase, Inc. =

American software company

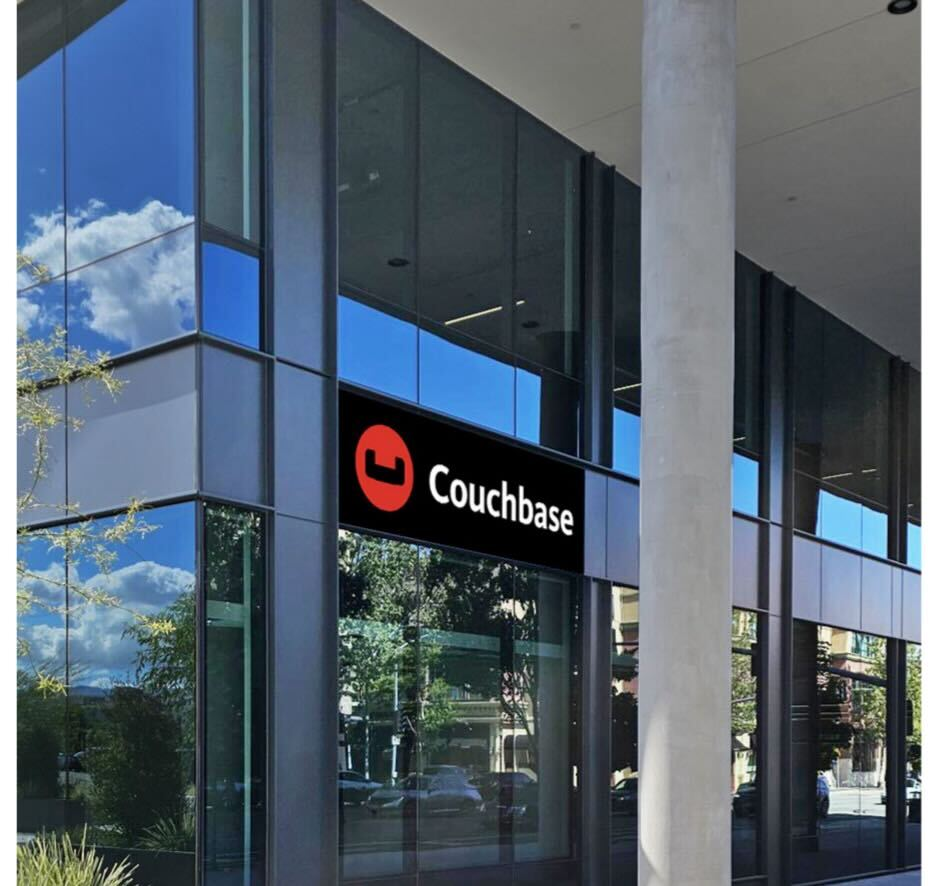
- Couchbase HQ in 2025
- Type: Private
- Industry: Software
- Founded: 2011; 15 years ago
- Headquarters: San Jose, California, USA
- Key people: BJ Schaknowski (CEO)
- Owner: Haveli Investments
- Website: www.couchbase.com

Couchbase, Inc. is an American public software company that provides a unified, AI-ready developer data platform for mission-critical applications across cloud, on-premises, mobile and edge environments. The firm develops and supports Couchbase Server, Couchbase Capella (its fully-managed database-as-a-service), and Couchbase Mobile & Edge, including Couchbase Lite, an embedded database for offline-first apps.

Headquartered in San Jose, California, it has additional offices in Austin, Bengaluru, Tel Aviv, Singapore, and London. On September 24, 2025, the company was acquired by Haveli Investments in a deal valued at approximately $1.5 billion.

== History ==
NorthScale was founded in 2009, and in March 2010 announced $5 million in funding from Accel Partners and North Bridge Venture Partners. Original officers listed were James Phillips, Steve Yen and Dustin Sallings, who were involved in the development of memcached. In May 2010, a $10 million investment led by the Mayfield Fund was announced for NorthScale, and Bob Wiederhold replaced Phillips as chief executive. Some time later in 2010, NorthScale was renamed Membase, Incorporated.

CouchOne Inc. was also founded in 2009 as Relaxed, in Berkeley, California. It developed and provided commercial support for the Apache CouchDB open source project, a document database. Initial funding was $2 million, including investor Redpoint Ventures. Couchbase, Inc. was created through the merger of Membase and CouchOne in February 2011. The merged company aimed to build an easily scalable, high-performance document-oriented database system, marketed with the term NoSQL.

In August 2011, a $14 million funding was led by Ignition Partners. In October 2011, DoCoMo Capital announced an investment of $1 million was part of that round. In August, 2013, another round of $25 million was led by Adams Street Partners. A round of $60 million in June, 2014, included new investor WestSummit. A round of $30 million in March, 2016, was reported as giving a reduced valuation to the company. Peter Finter became chief marketing officer in September 2016. Matt Cain replaced Bob Wiederhold as CEO in April 2017.

The company raised funding from Accel Partners, North Bridge Venture Partners, Mayfield Fund, Redpoint Ventures, Ignition Partners, and others. Couchbase completed its initial public offering on July 21, 2021, and is listed on the NASDAQ under the ticker symbol BASE.

Recognition include the 2012 Infoworld Bossie award, Dataweek 2012 award, Always-On Global award, VentureWire's 50 FASTTech companies GigaOM's Structure 50 list and the Gartner cool vendor award.

== M&A Activity ==
On June 20 2025, Couchbase announced it had entered into a definitive agreement to be acquired by Haveli Investments (led by ex-Vista Equity Partners president Brian Sheth) for $1.5 billion. Under the terms of the deal, Couchbase shareholders will receive $24.50 per share in cash—representing a 29 % premium to the closing price immediately prior and a 67 % premium to the March 27 2025 price. The merger agreement includes a “go-shop” period expiring June 23, 2025, during which Couchbase may solicit superior proposals. Closing is expected in H2 2025, subject to customary regulatory and shareholder approvals.

== Couchbase key milestones ==
2010

- June 2010 – Membase project begins. NoSQL’s rise and the Membase launch notes the project was open-sourced in mid-2010 by memcached leaders with Zynga and NHN (now Naver). WIRED

2011

- Feb 2011 – CouchOne and Membase merge to form Couchbase, Inc. TechCrunch, eWEEK

2012

- Jan 2012 – Couchbase Server 1.8 GA. Rebranded Membase line. Scribd
- Dec 2012 – Couchbase Server 2.0 GA with JSON document store, distributed indexing/query, incremental MapReduce, and XDCR. InfoQ, The Register, Database Trends and Applications

2014

- May 2014 – Couchbase Mobile 1.0. Couchbase’s mobile stack for iOS/Android with local data store and sync gateway. InformationWeek
- Oct 2014 – ForestDB engine announced (B+-trees). Couchbase replaces its storage engine with ForestDB for performance/transactions. InfoQ

2015

- Oct 2015 – Couchbase Server 4.0 introduces multi-dimensional scaling, geospatial indexes and new query language N1QL (SQL++). SQL-like query leap. InfoWorld
- Dec 2015 – Couchbase Mobile 1.1. 1.1 drop (Lite & Sync Gateway enhancements). Dzone

2016

- Feb 2016 – Couchbase Mobile 1.2 (enterprise-grade upgrades incl. ForestDB in Lite). TDWI
- Nov 2016 – Server 4.6 Developer Preview with FTS improvements, XDCR with globally ordered conflict resolution, and real-time connectors for Spark 2.0 and Kafka. InfoQ, ADTmag

2017

- Oct 2017 – Server 5.0 GA (Full-Text Search service broad availability; ephemeral buckets). Altoros

2018

- Aug 2018 – Couchbase Mobile 2.1. SDTimes
- Oct 2018 – Couchbase Server 6.0 GA; Analytics Service for JSON (SQL++/no-ETL) and the Kubernetes Autonomous Operator introduced around this period. VentureBeat, 1PR Newswire

2019

- Apr 2019 – Couchbase Mobile 2.5 adds Predictive Query API (DP), enhanced logging, fine-grained replication events, expanded Sync Gateway monitoring. VentureBeat

2020

- Jan 2020 – Server 6.5 adds distributed ACID transactions; Mobile 2.7/SG 2.7. 6.5 momentum. TechTarget
- Jul 2020 – “Couchbase Cloud” (later Capella) GA on AWS. Managed DBaaS launch. VentureBeat
- Aug 2020 – Server 6.6 GA. Performance and manageability updates. VentureBeat

2021

- Jul 2021 – Server 7.0 GA, fusing NoSQL flexibility with relational concepts (collections/scopes, SQL transactions). The Register
- Oct/Nov 2021 – Capella (managed DBaaS) launch/branding on AWS. CRN
- Oct 2021 – Couchbase Lite 3.0 & Sync Gateway 3.0 (C API for broader devices, SQL++ on mobile). GitHub

2022

- June 2022 – Capella on Google Cloud. Multi-cloud expansion. IoT Now

2023

- Jan 19, 2023 – Capella on Microsoft Azure. InfoWorld
- Nov/Dec 2023 – Capella Analytics (a.k.a. Columnar) announced. forums.theregister.com, Database Trends and Applications

2024

- Mar 2024 – Server 7.6 GA adds Vector Search & SQL++ enhancements. Vector search across Server/Capella. Blocks and Files
- Aug 2024 – Couchbase Lite 3.2 & Sync Gateway 3.3 (LTS) with vector search integration. Mobile/edge vector search availability. Blocks and Files
- Dec 2, 2024 – Capella AI Services: independent coverage details Model Service (LLM hosting), Vectorization, Unstructured Data Service, AI Agent Catalog, and AI Functions for SQL++. SiliconANGLE, TechTarget, CRN

2025

- Jan & May 2025 – 7.6.x maintenance (7.6.5/7.6.6). Community version trackers reflect current 7.6.x release. VentureBeat
- Feb 24–25, 2025 – NVIDIA NIM integration. TechTarget, Channel Insider
- Mar 4, 2025 – Couchbase Edge Server 1.0 GA (lightweight, offline-first, ~1 GB RAM target). The New Stackedgeir.com, DEVOPSdigest, Database Trends and Applications
- July 2025 – Capella listed in the new AWS Marketplace “AI Agents & Tools” category. See AWS Marketplace listing and third-party trade coverage of the new category and Capella’s availability. Amazon Web Services, Inc.Channel Insider, DEVOPSdigest

== Community ==
Couchbase maintains official discussion forums and a Discord server for developers; the “couchbase” tag on Stack Overflow has over 4,000 questions (as of August 2025). Its open-source ecosystem is active on GitHub, including the Couchbase Labs organization with about 890 public repositories (as of August 2025). The independent DB-Engines ranking placed Couchbase 40th among database management systems in August 2025.
