= UiPath =

Romanian-American software company

UiPath Inc.
- Type: Public
- Traded as: NYSE: PATH (Class A); S&P 400 component
- Industry: Software
- Founded: 2005; 21 years ago in Bucharest, Romania
- Founders: Daniel Dines; Marius Tîrcă; Adrian Dorache; Andra Ciorici; Lavinia Cojocaru
- Headquarters: One Vanderbilt, New York City, U.S.
- Number of locations: 31 countries
- Area served: Worldwide
- Key people: Daniel Dines (chairman and CEO); Ashim Gupta (CFO); Michael Atalla (CMO)
- Products: Agentic AI software; RPA tools
- Revenue: ▲US$1.43 billion (2025)
- Operating income: ▲US$−163 million (2025)
- Net income: ▲US$−74 million (2025)
- Total assets: ▼US$2.87 billion (2025)
- Total equity: ▼US$1.85 billion (2025)
- Number of employees: 3,868 (2025)
- Website: uipath.com
- Footnotes; Financials as of January 31, 2025.

UiPath Inc. is a Romanian-American multinational software company that develops artificial intelligence (AI) and agentic automation and orchestration software. The company's software enables the building and orchestration of AI agents to automate complex processes and workflows.

Founded in 2005 in Bucharest, Romania, by Daniel Dines and Marius Tîrcă, the company is headquartered in New York City. The company became public on April 21, 2021, which at the time was reportedly one of the largest US software IPOs in history.

== History ==
UiPath was founded in 2005 in Bucharest, Romania as DeskOver, by Romanian entrepreneurs Daniel Dines and Marius Tîrcă.

In 2013, the company released the first UiPath Desktop Automation product line, which gave companies RPA tools to automate manual and repetitive back office tasks.

In 2015, the company changed its name to UiPath. Also in 2015, after receiving seed funding from Accel Partners and earlier investors, the company also opened offices in London, New York City, Bangalore, Paris, Singapore, Washington, D.C., and Tokyo.

By April 2016, the company had released its Front Office and Back Office Server suites, and also released its Studio Community Edition. Within six months, the company had 10,000 active members, and more than 250 enterprise customers.

In 2017, UiPath reported 590 employees and moved its headquarters to New York to be closer to its international customer base.

In October 2019, UiPath announced the acquisition of Ukrainian process documentation company StepShot and Dutch process mining company ProcessGold. Also in October, the company announced several updates to its technology platform, including UiPath Explorer, an automation identification and planning tool developed using technology from the acquired companies; a robot communication tool called UiPath Apps; a low code robot programming tool called UiPath StudioX; an embedded analytics tool called UiPath Insights; and UiPath Connect, a tool that allowed every employee to find new processes to automate.

In November of the same year, the company reported it had 5,000 customers worldwide, and a developer community of more than 500,000 people. In November, the company was ranked first in the Deloitte Technology Fast 500.

In March 2021, UiPath acquired Cloud Elements, an interconnectivity platform to advance API-based automation capabilities.

In April 2021, UiPath raised $1.3 billion in an initial public offering on the New York Stock Exchange in one of the largest US software IPOs in history.

In July 2022, UiPath acquired Re:infer, a natural language processing developer, for an undisclosed sum.

In July 2024, the company released its UiPath Autopilot program, which integrated generative AI and NLP into its Business Automation Platform. It also announced a collaboration with Microsoft to integrate agentic AI into Microsoft's Teams collaboration software.

In October 2024, the company launched a preview of its Agent Builder, an agentic automation tool for developers to combine RPA with generative AI-powered agents to help simplify enterprise automation efforts.

In March 2025, the company announced its UiPath Test Cloud, a tool to improve software testing by integrating AI agents. Also in March, UiPath acquired Peak, a Manchester-headquartered AI company specializing in agentic solutions for inventory and pricing optimization, for an undisclosed sum.

In April 2025, the company launched UiPath Platform for Agentic Automation, with an orchestration layer called Maestro, allowing employees to work more effectively with agents and robots.

In October 2025, the UiPath Platform was named as one of TIME Magazine's Best Inventions of 2025.

== Products ==
UiPath develops agentic automation software that combines robots, AI agents and people to automate workflows and processes. Agentic automation integrates traditional robotic process automation (RPA), artificial intelligence, and human decision-making capabilities to allow for larger, more complex automations.

UiPath's main product is the UiPath Platform for Agentic Automation. The platform combines a family of low-code visual integrated development environment (IDE) products called UiPath Studio for process creation, with client-side agents called Robots that execute those processes. An important part of the platform is UiPath Maestro, an orchestration engine designed to automate, model and optimize complex business processes, and monitor the performance of agents and robots.

Its earlier RPA products simplified tasks performed using other business software such as CRM or ERP systems, in internal and back-office areas like accounting, human resources paperwork, and claims processing.

UiPath also hosts the UiPath Academy, to provide job training and certification in the fields of agentic automation and robotic process automation.

== Funding ==
When	Funding raised	Valuation	Who and notes
August 2015	US$1.6 million		UiPath closed an initial seed funding round led by Bek Ventures, with Credo Ventures and Seedcamp as backers.
April 2017	$30 million investment		One of the biggest Series A rounds of funding in Europe, led by Accel. Previous investors Bek Ventures, Credo Ventures and Seedcamp also joined.
March 6, 2018	$153 million investment	$1.1 billion	from Accel, CapitalG, and Kleiner Perkins Caufield & Byers.
September 18, 2018	$225 million	$3 billion valuation	Funding round led by CapitalG and Sequoia Capital.
April 30, 2019	$568 million	$7 billion (claimed by the company after the funding round)	Series D round of funding led by hedge fund Coatue Management, with participation from Alphabet's CapitalG, Sequoia, Accel, Madrona Venture Group, IVP, Dragoneer, Wellington, Sands Capital, and funds advised by T. Rowe Price & Associates.
July 13, 2020	$225 million	$10.2 billion	
December 17, 2020			UiPath filed a confidential draft registration statement with the United States Securities and Exchange Commission for an initial public offering.
February 1, 2021	$750 million	$35 billion (post-money valuation)	Series F funding.
