= European Supermarket Magazine =

Pan-European Grocery retail trade magazine

ESM: European Supermarket Magazine
- Categories: Trade magazine, FMCG
- Frequency: bimonthly
- Publisher: Madison Publications Ltd.
- First issue: December 2009; 15 years ago
- Based in: Dún Laoghaire, Ireland
- Language: English
- Website: www.esmmagazine.com

European Supermarket Magazine is a pan-European publication focusing on the grocery retail and fast-moving consumer goods sectors. Published by Madison Publications Limited, its first issue appeared in December 2009. The magazine is often referred to by readers by its acronym, ESM, which is also the magazine's logo.

== History ==
In 2009, Irish publishing house Madison Publications Ltd. launched European Supermarket Magazine (ESM), a sister company to Checkout Ireland Ltd., which has published Irish retail trade publication Checkout since 1966.

European Supermarket Magazine is owned by publisher Kevin Kelly, the former creator and publisher of World of Interiors, Departures, Business, W Magazine (UK edition), World of Hibernia, Image, Image Interiors, and Food & Wine Magazine (Ireland). He sold his stake in Image Publications, Ltd. in 2010. Stephen Wynne-Jones, formerly the editor of Checkout magazine, has been editor of European Supermarket Magazine since 2014.

In 2013, the publication opened a Slovakian office in the capital of Bratislava, which houses its European sales division. The magazine also has a Spanish office based out of Madrid.

== Format and content ==
The digital and print versions of European Supermarket Magazine offer breaking news for professionals working in the European retail and FMCG sectors, as well as market profiles, special reports and interviews with industry figures.

The magazine is published six times a year, both in hard copy and digital formats.

Initially offering free content on its website, European Supermarket Magazine introduced a soft paywall on its website in late 2017. The magazine’s digital content includes a weekly newsletter, with a mix of free and subscriber-only content.

The website is also available in mobile application format, the ESM News App.

== Audience and circulation ==
The main audience for the magazine includes senior executives, buyers and category managers operating in the European retail sector across 33 countries. The annual procurement purchasing power of the readership of the print publication is estimated to be in excess of €880 billion per year.

The magazine had a readership of 28,749 (as of end 2017).

== European Private Label Awards ==
Since 2017, European Supermarket Magazine has held the annual European Private Label Awards, which award the most impactful and innovative private-label or store-brand products found on European supermarket shelves, judged by an external panel.

Retailers and suppliers of private-label products can enter their products into awards across various retail categories, ranging from excellence in dairy products, confectionery, frozen food, and ambient grocery.

In its inaugural year, the awards received entries from grocery operators worldwide. Retailers in Italy, Belgium, Norway, Spain, and the UK were named as finalists.

M.A.D.E., a food trade exhibition in Paris, came on board as the sponsor of the 2019 awards. Judging took place in November 2018 in Dublin.

The 2019 competition received twice as many entrants as last year, with grocery operators in Germany, Italy, Spain, France, the UK, Denmark, Ireland, the Netherlands, Belgium, Hungary, Sweden, Norway and Portugal taking part, as well as a number of private-label suppliers. There were 12 categories in total.

Lidl, Spar, Dunnes Stores, Coop Norge, REWE, Conad, ICA and Real were named as category winners, with Lidl Netherlands taking the top prize in three award categories: Ambient Grocery, Beverages - Non-Alcoholic and Convenience Foods.

Irish retailer Dunnes Stores was chosen as the winner in two categories (Frozen Food and Tea, Coffee & Hot Drinks), while global retailer Spar also took two awards, one for Spar International (Confectionery & Snacking) and one for Spar Netherlands (Beverages - Alcoholic).

German supermarket chain REWE took the top prize in the Dairy Products category, Coop Norge (Norway) was named winner in the Meat & Seafood category, ICA (Sweden) won the Non-Food (Household) category, Italian cooperative Conad was awarded first prize in Non-Food (Personal Care), and Real was named winner in the Pet Care category.

A full-list of winners and finalists can be found on the European Supermarket Magazine website.

== Award nominations ==
In 2017, European Supermarket Magazine’s website, www.esmmagazine.com, was nominated for ‘Best B2B News Site’ at the Drum Online Media Awards.
