= AMPLab =

UC Berkeley research lab

AMPLAB was a University of California, Berkeley lab focused on big data analytics located in Soda Hall. The name stands for the Algorithms, Machines and People Lab. It has been publishing papers since 2008 and was officially launched in 2011. The AMPLab was co-directed by Professor Michael J. Franklin, Michael I. Jordan, and Ion Stoica.

While AMPLab has worked on a wide variety of big data projects (known as BDAS, the Berkeley Data Analytics Stack), many know it as the lab that invented Apache Mesos, and Apache Spark, and Alluxio.

Berkeley launched RISELab as the successor to AMPLab in 2017.
