= Finale Doshi-Velez =

American computer scientist

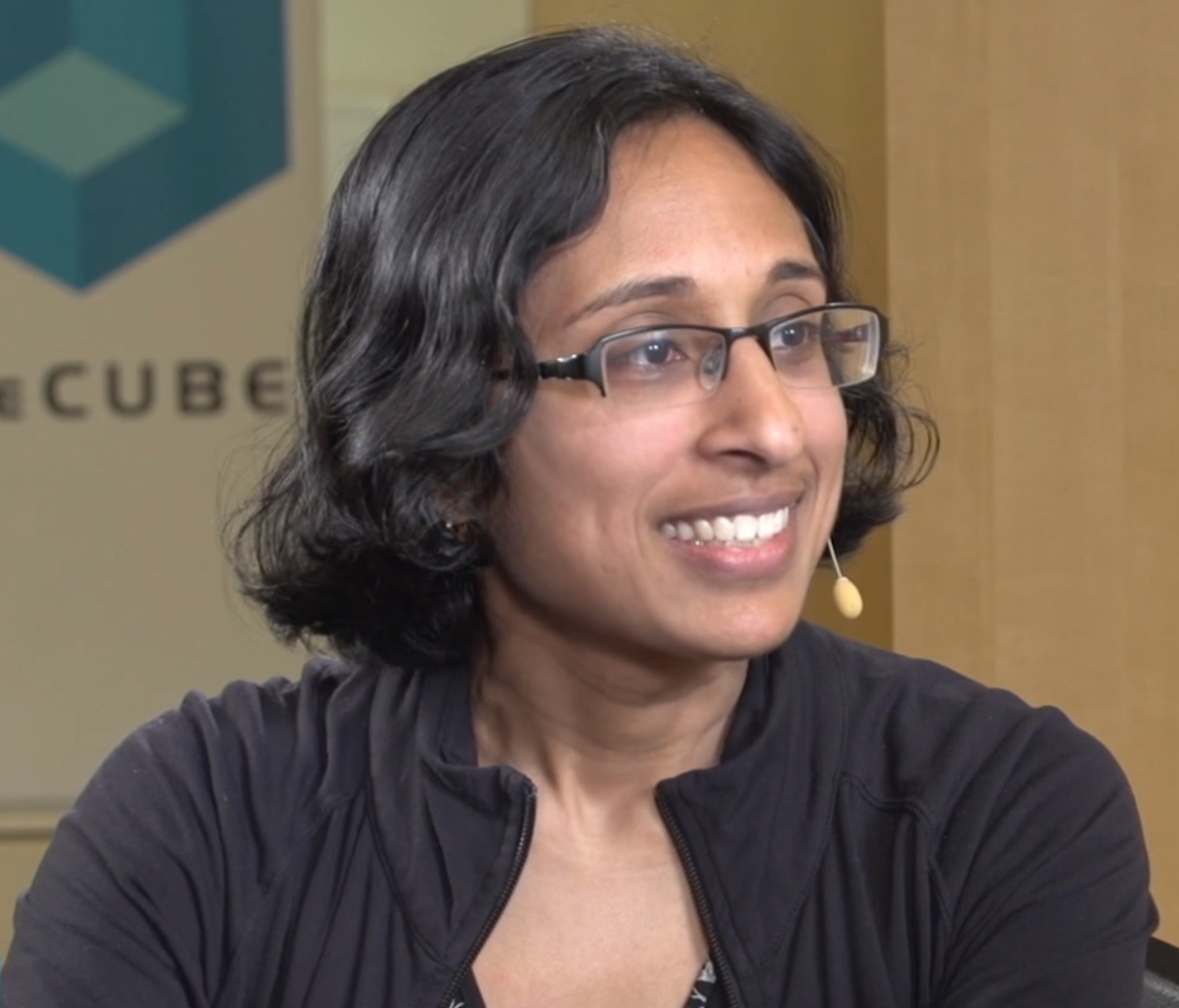
- Doshi-Velez interviewed in 2017
- Education: Massachusetts Institute of Technology; Trinity College, Cambridge
- Scientific career
- Workplaces: Harvard University
- Thesis: Bayesian nonparametric approaches for reinforcement learning in partially observable domains (2012)

Finale Doshi-Velez is a computer scientist and the John L. Loeb Professor of Engineering and Applied Sciences at Harvard University. She works on machine learning, computational statistics and healthcare.

== Early life and education ==
After graduating from the Maggie L. Walker Governor's School for Government and International Studies, Doshi-Velez studied aerospace engineering at Massachusetts Institute of Technology. She earned her master's degree in 2007. In 2007 Doshi-Velez was awarded a Marshall Scholarship to study at Trinity College, Cambridge, where she earned her second master's degree on the Indian Buffet Process. She was supervised by Zoubin Ghahramani. She was a postgraduate student at Massachusetts Institute of Technology, where she worked on Bayesian nonparametric statistics with Nicholas Roy. She completed a postdoctoral fellowship in bioinformatics at Harvard Medical School, and is the John L. Loeb Professor of Engineering and Applied Sciences professor at Harvard University's John A. Paulson School of Engineering and Applied Sciences.

== Research and career ==
Doshi-Velez uses big data for medical applications, including diagnosis of disease. She joined Harvard University in 2014. Medical doctors make diagnoses based on the symptoms experienced by their patients. Clinical data can be combined with latent variable models to make predictions about hidden diseases. Doshi-Velez has continued to use Bayesian nonparametric statistics to model latent variables. She develops data-based phenotypes for autism spectrum disorder, irritable bowel syndrome and type 2 diabetes. Using cluster analysis, Doshi-Velez identified that certain people with autism spectrum disorder, a subgroup, would be more susceptible for major psychiatric disorders. She is interested in personalised medicine for patients suffering with HIV and depression. Doshi-Velez is interested in making her algorithms interpretable to physicians.

Doshi-Velez has delivered many popular science talks, including two TED Talks The Possibility of Explanation and AI for Understanding Disease. She spoke about accountability in artificial intelligence at Google in 2017.

=== Awards and honours ===
Her awards and honours include;

- 2013 Institute of Electrical and Electronics Engineers Top 10 in Artificial Intelligence
- 2016 Air Force Research Laboratory Young Investigator Award
- 2018 Sloan Research Fellowship
- 2019 Everett Mendelsohn Excellence in Mentoring Award
- 2019 J. P. Morgan Faculty Award Recipient
