= Emmanuel School of Mission =

Information
- School type: Independent School; Boarding School
- Motto: Give all, get more !
- Religious affiliation: Christian
- Denomination: Roman Catholic
- Founded: 1984
- Founder: Pierre Goursat
- Closed: 2020
- Gender: Boys ans Girls
- Age: 18 to 30
- Enrollment: 140
- Houses: 7
- Affiliation: Emmanuel Community
- Website: http://www.emmanuel.info/esm/

Emmanuel School of Mission (ESM) is a private educational institute of Emmanuel Community for a Roman Catholic missionary that operates boarding schools on four continents. These schools are situated in New York City, Roma, Salvador, Manila, Altötting, Bafoussam and Paray-le-Monial.

This institute was founded by Pierre Goursat and Francis Kohn, in 1984, with the first school in Wissous (France). The school was closed in the spring of 2020.

== Structure and facilities ==
These boarding schools inhabit two-story buildings including a chapel, classrooms, bedrooms, a computer lab and a library.

== Formation ==
More than 500 hours of intellectual, human, missionary and spiritual training are taught. The different subjects taught are : holy Scripture, foundations of the Faith, liturgy, art and faith, philosophy, moral theology, integral ecology, spiritual life, communication, evangelization, other religions, anthropology.
