= Databricks =

San Francisco-based software company

Databricks, Inc.

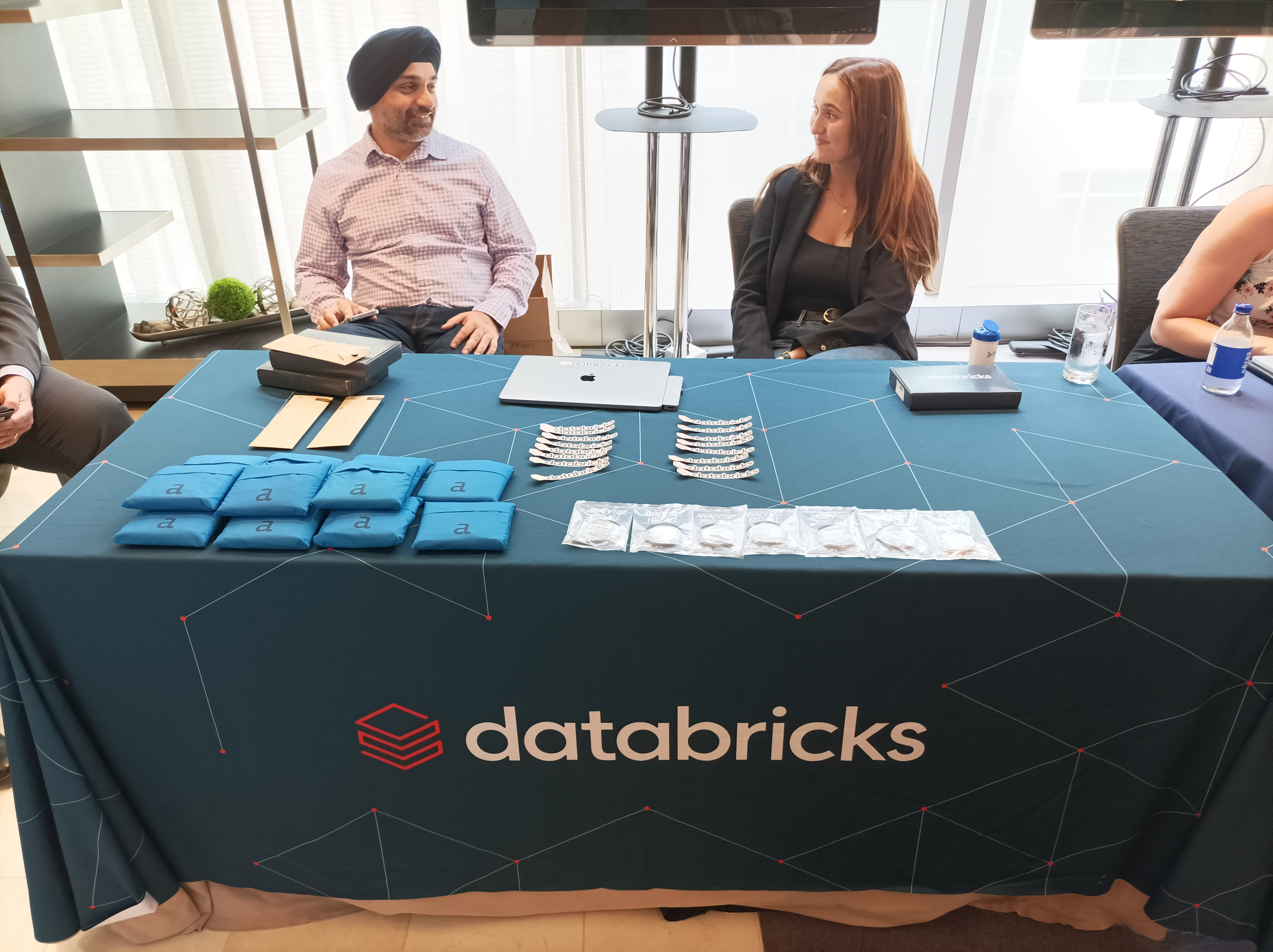
- Databricks booth
- Type: Private
- Industry: Computer software Artificial intelligence
- Founded: 2013; 13 years ago
- Founders: Ali Ghodsi; Andy Konwinski; Ion Stoica; Patrick Wendell; Reynold Xin; Matei Zaharia; Arsalan Tavakoli
- Headquarters: San Francisco, California, United States
- Products: Genie; Lakebase; Lakehouse; Lakeflow; Unity Catalog; Agent Bricks; Lakewatch; Databricks Apps
- Revenue: ▲$6.9 billion (80% YoY) (ARR, Jun 2026)
- Net income: Free cash flow positive (2025)
- Number of employees: 10,000 (2026)
- Website: databricks.com

Databricks, Inc. is an American data software and artificial intelligence company headquartered in San Francisco, California. It was founded in 2013 by the original creators of Apache Spark, an open-source framework that was commercialized as Spark through the company. It offers cloud computing-based data analytics solutions, and can run on Amazon Web Services, Microsoft Azure, and Google Cloud Platform.

Databricks developed the "data lakehouse" architecture, which combines elements of data warehouses and data lakes for managing structured and unstructured data. The company develops Delta Lake, an open-source project that adds ACID transaction support to data lakes.

== History ==
=== 2013–2021 ===
Databricks grew out of the AMPLab project at University of California, Berkeley, that was involved in making Apache Spark, an open-source distributed computing framework built atop Scala. The company was founded by Ali Ghodsi, Andy Konwinski, Arsalan Tavakoli-Shiraji, Ion Stoica, Matei Zaharia, Patrick Wendell, and Reynold Xin. In 2013, the founding team established Databricks to commercialize Spark. That year, the company raised a series A funding round of $14 million led by venture capital firm Andreessen Horowitz. Stoica served as the company's chief executive officer from 2013 to 2016, when he was succeeded by Ghodsi. In June 2014, Databricks launched its first product, Databricks Cloud, a cloud-based platform to process big data.

Microsoft Azure integrated Databricks as Azure Databricks in 2017.

In February 2021, together with Google Cloud, Databricks provided integration with the Google Kubernetes Engine and Google's BigQuery platform. In February 2021, the company reported having more than 5,000 customers.

=== 2022–present ===
In 2023, Databricks announced the Data Intelligence Platform, integrating its lakehouse architecture with generative AI capabilities acquired from MosaicML.

In March 2023, in response to the popularity of OpenAI's ChatGPT, the company introduced an open-source language model, named Dolly after Dolly the sheep, that developers could use to create custom chatbots. Dolly has only 6 billion parameters. Databricks claimed that Dolly had "ChatGPT-like instruction following ability", but has not released formal benchmark tests comparing it to ChatGPT.

In December 2024, Databricks along with Wiz and Workday has decided to run their products on top of AWS via the new button called "Buy with AWS".

In March 2024, Databricks released its foundation model, called DBRX, on the Databricks Open Model License. It has a mixture-of-experts architecture and is built on the MegaBlocks open-source project. DBRX cost $10 million to create. According to the company, DBRX performed competitively on industry benchmarks against other open-source models available at the time. It beat other models like Llama 2 at solving logic puzzles and answering general knowledge questions, among other tasks. While it has 136 billion parameters, it only uses 36 billion, on average, to generate outputs. According to Databricks, DBRX can be used as a foundation for companies to build customized AI models using their proprietary data.

The firm was valued at $62 billion in December 2024, following a $10 billion funding round.

In early March 2025, Databricks announced it would invest $1 billion in San Francisco's downtown.

In June 2025, Databricks entered into a four-year partnership with Alphabet to incorporate Gemini into the Databricks platform. The company launched Agent Bricks, a suite of tools to help organizations build AI agents, and Lakebase, an OLTP database.

In April 2025, Databricks was featured in the Forbes AI 50 list.

In December 2025, Databricks raised more than $4 billion in a Series L funding round at a $134 billion valuation. This was Databricks' third major fundraise in less than a year. "It comes as the company focuses on building products that address the needs of the AI revolution: a database for AI agents, an AI agent platform, and apps that let companies build and deploy data and AI applications."

== Partnerships and acquisitions ==
=== Corporate partnerships ===
In March 2025, Databricks entered a five-year partnership with Anthropic, incorporating Anthropic's AI products into its platform in a deal valued at $100 million.

In June 2025, Databricks announced a partnership with Google Cloud to integrate its platform with Google Cloud services. In July 2026, Databricks and Microsoft announced an expanded mutual integration of each other's products and services extending into the 2030s. As part of the partnership, Databricks employed Azure, Microsoft's cloud computing platform and Microsoft's Cobalt processors, while Microsoft integrated Databrick's data and AI technologies, including Databricks's chatbot Genie, into its product suite, like Microsoft 365, Teams and Copilot.

In September 2025, Databricks entered into a partnership with OpenAI to incorporate the company's LLMs into the Databricks platform in a deal valued at $100 million.

=== Acquisitions ===
In June 2020, Databricks bought Redash, an open-source tool for data visualization and building of interactive dashboards. In 2021, it bought German no-code company 8080 Labs whose product, bamboolib, allowed data exploration without any coding. In May 2023, Databricks bought data security group Okera, extending Databricks data governance capabilities. In June, it bought the open-source generative AI startup MosaicML for $1.4 billion. In October, Databricks bought data replication startup Arcion for $100 million. In 2024, Databricks bought data-management startup Tabular for over $1 billion.

Databricks reported $1.6 billion in revenue for the 2023 fiscal year.

In 2025, Databricks acquired a serverless database startup, Neon, for around $1 billion. In June 2026, Databricks announced it had agreed to acquire Panther Labs, an AI security operations center (SOC) platform, in order to use Panther's technology to support development for the security lakehouse capabilities of Lakewatch. In August 2026, Databricks acquired Electric, a data synchronization firm, to extend its PostgreSQL capabilities and support the expansion of its Lakebase infrastructure.

== Finance ==
=== Funding ===
In September 2013, Databricks announced it raised $13.9 million from Andreessen Horowitz and said it aimed to offer an alternative to Google's MapReduce system. Microsoft was a noted investor of Databricks in 2019, participating in the company's Series E at an unspecified amount. The company has raised $1.9 billion in funding, including a $1 billion Series G led by Franklin Templeton at a $28 billion post-money valuation in February 2021. Other investors include Amazon Web Services, CapitalG (a growth equity firm under Alphabet Inc.) and Salesforce Ventures. In August 2021, Databricks finished its eighth round of funding by raising $1.6 billion and valuing the company at $38 billion. In December 2024, Databricks announced a $10 billion financing at a valuation of $62 billion. In August 2025, Databricks announced a $1 billion Series K funding round, raising their valuation to over $100 billion. Just 3 months later, in December 2025, Databricks completed a $4 billion Series L funding round at a new valuation of $134 billion.

In July 2026, Coatue Management led a funding round for a $3 billion investment in Databricks, making the company's overall valuation $188 billion. The funding round closed at $5 billion in August 2026, with a $190 billion post-money valuation and $7 billion revenue run rate. In addition to Coatue Management, Blackstone Inc., MGX, T. Rowe Price and Sixth Street Growth were investors in the round.

Funding rounds
Series	Date	Amount (million $)	Lead investors
A	2013	13.9	Andreessen Horowitz
B	2014	33	New Enterprise Associates
C	2016	60	New Enterprise Associates
D	2017	140	Andreessen Horowitz
E	Feb. 2019	250	Andreessen Horowitz
F	Oct. 2019	400	Andreessen Horowitz
G	Jan. 2021	1,000	Franklin Templeton Investments
H	Aug. 2021	1,600	Morgan Stanley
I	Sep. 2023	500	Capital One Ventures, Nvidia
J	Dec. 2024	10,000	Thrive Capital
K	Aug. 2025	1,000	Thrive Capital, Insight Partners
L	Dec. 2025	4,000	Insight Partners, Fidelity, J.P. Morgan

=== Revenue ===
As of February 9, 2026, Databricks had a $5.4 billion revenue run rate, growing > 65% year over year. Databricks also delivered positive free cash flow over the 12 months prior.

As of June 16, 2026, CNBC reported that Databricks' annualized revenue reached $6.9 billion, representing an 80% year-over-year growth.

== Products ==
Databricks develops a cloud data platform referred to as a 'lakehouse', combining features of data warehouses and data lakes. Unlike traditional proprietary data warehouses, the Databricks architecture processes data while allowing organizations to retain the underlying files in their own cloud storage using open-source formats like Apache Iceberg and Delta Lake. Industry analysts note this separation of compute and storage mitigates vendor lock-in and avoids proprietary data egress fees.

The platform is built on the open-source Apache Spark framework, enabling analytical queries on semi-structured data without requiring a traditional database schema. While the platform's classic architecture provided robust distributed computing capabilities, it inherently required data teams to manually configure, size, and manage the underlying cluster infrastructure. To eliminate this operational complexity, Databricks introduced a serverless architecture across its analytics and AI workloads. This serverless tier fully abstracts the cloud environment, automatically provisioning, scaling, and terminating compute resources without requiring manual tuning or cluster management.

In October 2022, Lakehouse received FedRAMP authorization for use with the U.S. federal government and contractors.

The company has also created Delta Lake, MLflow and Koalas, open source projects that span data engineering, data science and machine learning.

In June 2020, Databricks launched Delta Engine, a fast query engine for Delta Lake, compatible with Apache Spark and MLflow.

In November 2020, Databricks introduced Databricks SQL (previously called SQL Analytics) for running business intelligence and analytics reporting on top of data lakes. Analysts can query data sets with standard SQL or use connectors to integrate with business intelligence tools like Holistics, Tableau, Qlik, Sigma, Looker, and ThoughtSpot.

Databricks offers a platform for other workloads, including machine learning, data storage and processing, streaming analytics, and business intelligence.

In early 2024, Databricks released the Mosaic set of tools for customizing, fine-tuning and building AI systems. It includes AI Vector Search for building RAG models; AI Model Serving, a service for deploying, governing, querying and monitoring models fine-tuned or pre-deployed by Databricks; and AI Pretraining, a platform for enterprises to create their own LLMs.

In June 2024, Databricks open sourced Unity Catalog, a unified governance offering, under the Apache Spark 2.0 license.

In addition to building the Databricks platform, the company has co-organized massive open online courses about Spark and a conference for the Spark community called the Data + AI Summit, formerly known as Spark Summit.

At the 2025 Data + AI Summit, Databricks introduced Agent Bricks, a development platform for AI agents, Lakebase, a transactional database, and Databricks One, a no-code AI business intelligence platform. The company also disclosed its Databricks SQL product would grow to a $1 billion revenue run rate.

In March 2026, Databricks released Genie Code, an AI agent for data science and engineering tasks. That same month, the company announced Lakewatch, an AI-powered agentic security platform to automate threat detection and response.

In June 2026, Databricks released Omnigent, which it called an open source “meta-harness” for AI agents, like Anthropic's Claude Code and OpenAI's Codex, which are classified as harnesses, or the wrapper that turns AI models into agents. Omnigent is a common interface layer above command-line agents that allows users to build, control and collaborate on AI agents across models. During the company's "Data + AI Summit" conference, also in June 2026, Databricks announced a real-time analytics engine called Lakehouse//RT; an architecture to collapse online transaction processing and online analytical processing on a single copy of data, called LTAP (which is an initialism for "lake transactional-analytics process"); and Genie One, an agentic "co-worker." At the same conference, the company also released Genie ZeroOps, which automates monitoring, investigation and remediation of issues across data and AI workloads.
