= Apache Mesos =

Software to manage computer clusters

- Developer: Apache Software Foundation
- Stable release: 1.11.0 / November 24, 2020; 5 years ago
- Written in: C++
- Type: Cluster management software
- License: Apache License 2.0
- Website: mesos.apache.org
- Repository: Mesos Repository

Apache Mesos was an open-source project to manage computer clusters. It was developed at the University of California, Berkeley, and retired in August 2025.

== History ==
Mesos began as a research project in the UC Berkeley RAD Lab by then PhD students Benjamin Hindman, Andy Konwinski, and Matei Zaharia, as well as professor Ion Stoica. The students started working on the project as part of a course taught by David Culler. It was originally named Nexus but due to a conflict with another university's project, was renamed to Mesos.

Mesos was first presented in 2009 (while still named Nexus) by Andy Konwinski at HotCloud '09 in a talk accompanying the first paper published about the project. In 2011 a more developed version was presented in a talk by Zaharia at the Usenix Symposium on Networked Systems Design and Implementation. Specifically, he presented the paper on Mesos authored by Benjamin Hindman, Andy Konwinski Ali Ghodsi, Anthony D. Joseph, Randy Katz, Scott Shenker, Ion Stoica and Zaharia himself.

On July 27, 2016, the Apache Software Foundation announced version 1. It added the ability to centrally supply Docker, rkt and appc instances.

On April 5, 2021, it was voted to move Mesos to the Apache Attic, however the vote was cancelled two days later due to increased interest.

As of August 2025, this project was retired and placed into the attic October 2025. As such, all development on this project has ceased.

== Technology ==
Mesos uses Linux cgroups to provide isolation for CPU, memory, I/O and file system. Mesos is comparable to Google's Borg scheduler, a platform used internally to manage and distribute Google's services.

Apache Aurora
- Developer: Apache Software Foundation
- Final release: 0.22.0 / December 12, 2019; 6 years ago
- Written in: Java, Python
- Type: Mesos Framework
- License: Apache License 2.0
- Website: aurora.apache.org
- Repository: Aurora Repository

=== Apache Aurora ===
Apache Aurora is a Mesos framework for both long-running services and cron jobs, originally developed by Twitter starting in 2010 and open sourced in late 2013. It can scale to tens of thousands of servers, and holds many similarities to Borg including its rich domain-specific language (DSL) for configuring services. As of February 2020 the project was retired to the Attic. A fork of the project was maintained by former members, hosted on GitHub under the name Aurora Scheduler.

=== Chronos ===
Chronos is a distributed cron-like system which is elastic and capable of expressing dependencies between jobs.

=== Marathon ===
Marathon is promoted for platform as a service or container orchestration system scaling to thousands of physical servers. It is fully REST-based and allows canary-style deployments and deployment topologies. It is written in the programming language Scala.

== Users ==
The social networking site Twitter began using Mesos and Apache Aurora in 2010, after Hindman gave a presentation to a group of Twitter engineers.

Airbnb said in July 2013 that it uses Mesos to run data processing systems like Apache Hadoop and Apache Spark.

The Internet auction website eBay stated in April 2014 that it used Mesos to run continuous integration on a per-developer basis. They accomplish this by using a custom Mesos plugin that allows developers to launch their own private Jenkins instance.

In April 2015, it was announced that Apple service Siri is using its own Mesos framework called Jarvis.

In August 2015, it was announced that Verizon selected Mesosphere's DC/OS, which is based on open source Apache Mesos, for data center service orchestration.

In November 2015, Yelp announced they had been using Mesos and Marathon for a year and a half for production services.

== Commercial support ==
Software startup Mesosphere, Inc. sells the Datacenter Operating System, a distributed operating system, based on Apache Mesos. In September 2015, Microsoft announced a commercial partnership with Mesosphere to build container scheduling and orchestration services for Microsoft Azure. In October 2015, Oracle announced support for Mesos through Oracle Container Cloud Service.

== See also ==
- Dominant resource fairness - the resource-sharing policy used in Mesos.
- List of cluster management software
- Comparison of cluster software
