= End System Multicast =

Live video streaming system

End System Multicast (ESM) was a research project at Carnegie Mellon University. It developed a peercasting system for streaming live, high-quality video and audio to large audiences.

== History ==
The project was founded in 1999. It was used to broadcast events online over the internet, including:

- SIGCOMM 2002 and 2003, NOSSDAV 2004 and INFOCOM 2005
- John Kerry's rally at CMU in 2004
- cmuTV
- DARPA Grand Challenge in 2004
- RoboCup 2005

ESM was featured at the Intel Developer Forum in 2005.

ESM is no longer under active development by researchers at CMU. In 2006, several members of the ESM research group founded Rinera Networks in order to commercialize the ESM technology. In 2008, Rinera Networks changed its name to Conviva.

== Technology ==
ESM used a peer-to-peer network to distribute video data across all viewers of a video stream. It constructs an overlay tree to distribute data, and continuously optimizes this tree to minimize end-to-end latency. The root of the tree is the source of the broadcast. This is typically the machine that encodes the video data. This machine sends a stream of data packets to the nodes at the first level of the tree. Each of those nodes then forwards the data to the nodes connected to them, and so on, such that all nodes in the system receive the data stream.

ESM allowed any user with a DSL or broadband connection or higher to broadcast good quality video to a large number of people. Since it is a peer to peer network, a broadcaster need only broadcast the video to one person for any number of people to view it. Due to the nature of peer to peer multimedia networks, skips in playback or buffering can occur.

== Other Links ==
ESM Home Page
