= Matei Zaharia =

Romanian-Canadian computer scientist and engineer

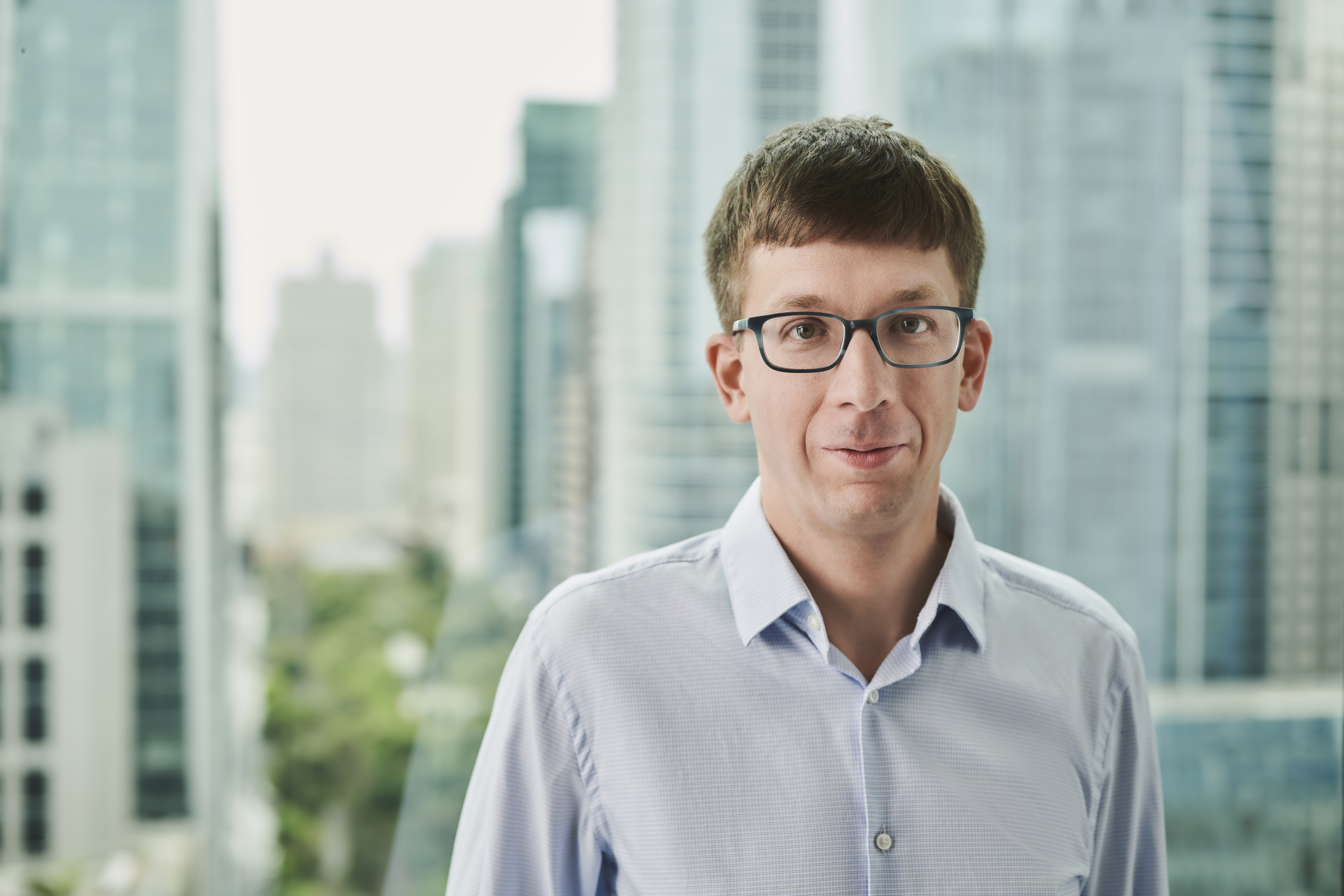
- Matei Zaharia in 2026
- Born: 1984 or 1985 (age 41–42)
- Education: UC Berkeley (Ph.D.); University of Waterloo (BMath)
- Known for: Apache Spark; Databricks
- Awards: ACM Doctoral Dissertation Award (2014); Presidential Early Career Award for Scientists and Engineers (2019); SIGOPS Mark Weiser Award (2023)
- Scientific career
- Fields: Computer science Artificial Intelligence
- Workplaces: UC Berkeley; Stanford University; Databricks
- Thesis: An Architecture for Fast and General Data Processing on Large Clusters (2013)
- Doctoral advisor: Ion Stoica; Scott Shenker
- Website: www.databricks.com/blog/author/matei-zaharia

Matei Zaharia (born 1984 or 1985) is a Romanian-Canadian computer scientist, educator businessman. He is the creator of Apache Spark and the chief technology officer, one of the founders of Databricks and has developed open-source projects like Delta Lake, MLflow and Omnigent.

In 2026, Forbes ranked him and Ion Stoica as the richest Romanians, with a net worth of $5 billion each.

== Education ==
Zaharia graduated from secondary school at Jarvis Collegiate Institute before moving to become an undergraduate at the University of Waterloo.

While pursuing his undergraduate degree at University of Waterloo, Zaharia earned a gold medal at the International Collegiate Programming Contest, where his team placed fourth in the world and first in North America in 2005. During his undergraduate degree at the University of Waterloo, he also greatly contributed to water rendering physics in the now open-source game 0 A.D. He also helped mod the Age of Mythology scenario called Norse Wars, which was re-adapted into the Age of Empires III scenario called Fort Wars.

While at University of California, Berkeley's AMPLab in 2009, he created Apache Spark as a faster alternative to MapReduce.

== Career ==
In 2013, Zaharia was one of the co-founders of Databricks, an American data software company offering cloud computing-based data analytics. As of October 2026, Zaharia is chief technology officer of the company.

=== Academia ===
He joined the faculty of MIT in 2015, and then became an assistant professor of computer science at Stanford University in 2016. In 2019 he spearheaded the development of MLflow at Databricks, while still teaching.

In 2023, he joined the faculty of the University of California, Berkeley as an associate professor in the departments of electrical engineering and computer sciences. Zaharia has co-authored open source platform research on DSPy and GEPA, which focused on optimizing prompts and models to improve the quality of AI agents for specific tasks.

== Awards & recognition ==
Zaharia received the 2014 ACM Doctoral Dissertation Award for his PhD research on large-scale computing. In 2019, Zaharia received the Presidential Early Career Award for Scientists and Engineers.

Zaharia received the 2025 ACM Prize in Computing for his foundational contributions to data and machine learning systems.

== See also ==
- List of University of Waterloo people
- Dominant resource fairness
