= Scott Shenker =

American computer scientist (born 1956)

- Born: January 24, 1956 (age 70); Alexandria, Virginia, US
- Education: Brown University; University of Chicago
- Awards: IEEE Fellow; ACM Fellow (2003); IEEE Internet Award (2006); Member of National Academy of Engineering (2012); Paris Kanellakis Award (2017); IEEE Alexander Graham Bell Medal (2026)
- Scientific career
- Workplaces: University of California, Berkeley; Xerox Corporation; University of Southern California
- Thesis: Scaling behavior in a map of a circle onto itself: Empirical results (1983)
- Doctoral advisor: Leo Kadanoff
- Doctoral students: Haoyuan Li; Matei Zaharia; Sylvia Ratnasamy
- Website: www.eecs.berkeley.edu/Faculty/Homepages/shenker.html

Scott J. Shenker (born January 24, 1956) is an American computer scientist and professor of computer science at the University of California, Berkeley. He is also the leader of the Extensible Internet Group at the International Computer Science Institute in Berkeley, California.

Over his career, Shenker has made research contributions in the areas of energy-efficient processor scheduling, resource sharing, and software-defined networking. Shenker is an ISI Highly Cited researcher. According to Google Scholar he is one of the five highest-ranked American computer scientists, with total citations exceeding 100,000.

== Biography ==
Shenker received his Sc.B. in physics from Brown University in 1978, and his PhD in physics from University of Chicago in 1983. In 2007, he received an honorary doctorate from the same university.

After working as a postdoctoral associate at Cornell University, he joined the research staff at Xerox PARC. He left PARC in 1998 to help found the AT&T Center for Internet Research, which was later renamed the ICSI Center for Internet Research (ICIR).

In 1995, Shenker contributed to the field of energy-efficient processor scheduling, co-authoring a paper on deadline-based scheduling with Frances Yao and Alan Demers. From 1995 to 2001, while working at Xerox PARC and later ICSI, he was an adjunct associate professor at the University of Southern California.

In 2002, Shenker joined the Berkeley faculty and received the SIGCOMM Award in recognition of his "contributions to Internet design and architecture, to fostering research collaboration, and as a role model for commitment and intellectual rigor in networking research".

In 2006, he received the IEEE Internet Award for "contributions towards an understanding of resource sharing on the Internet."

He is a Fellow of the ACM and IEEE and a member of the National Academy of Engineering. In 2016 he became a fellow of the American Academy of Arts and Sciences. He is the brother of string theorist Stephen Shenker.

Shenker is a leader in the movement toward software-defined networking (SDN). He is the co-founder of the Open Networking Foundation and of Nicira Networks.

In June 2021, Berkeley announced that Shenker had donated $25 million toward the university's computing and data science initiatives, making him and colleague Ion Stoica two of Berkeley's top benefactors.

In 2002, he received the SIGCOMM Award in recognition of his "contributions to Internet design and architecture, to fostering research collaboration, and as a role model for commitment and intellectual rigor in networking research".

In late 2025, he was announced by the IEEE as the recipient of the 2026 IEEE Alexander Graham Bell Medal "for contributions to Internet architecture, network resource allocation, and software-defined networking".

He is one of the inventors of dominant resource fairness.

== Publications (selection) ==
- H. Li, A. Ghodsi, M. Zaharia, S. Shenker, and I. Stoica, "Tachyon: Reliable, Memory Speed Storage for Cluster Computing Frameworks," in ACM Symposium on Cloud Computing, 2014.
- M. Zaharia, T. Das, H. Li, T. Hunter, S. Shenker, and I. Stoica, "Discretized Streams: Fault-Tolerant Streaming Computation at Scale," in ACM Symposium on Operating Systems Principles, 2013.
- R. S. Xin, J. Rosen, M. Zaharia, M. Franklin, S. Shenker, and I. Stoica, "Shark: SQL and Rich Analytics at Scale," EECS Department, University of California, Berkeley, Tech. Rep. UCB/EECS-2012-214, Nov. 2012.
- J. Feigenbaum and S. Shenker, "Distributed algorithmic mechanism design: Recent results and future directions," in Proc. 6th Intl. Workshop on Discrete Algorithms and Methods for Mobile Computing and Communications, New York, NY: ACM Press, 2002, pp. 1–13.
- S. Ratnasamy, P. Francis, M. Handley, R. M. Karp, and S. Shenker, "A scalable content-addressable network," in Proc. ACM SIGCOMM 2001 Conf.: Applications, Technologies, Architectures, and Protocols for Computer Communications, New York, NY: The Association for Computing Machinery, Inc., 2001, pp. 161–172.
- R. Braden, D. Clark, and S. Shenker, "Integrated Services in the Internet Architecture: An Overview," Internet Engineering Task Force, Tech. Rep. RFC 1633, June 1994.
- A. Demers, S. Keshav, and S. Shenker, "Analysis and simulation of a fair queueing algorithm," in Proc. SIGCOMM '89 Symp. on Communications Architectures and Protocols, New York, NY: ACM Press, 1989, pp. 1–12.
- A. Demers, D. Greene, C. Hauser, W. Irish, J. Larson, S. Shenker, H. Sturgis, D. Swinehart, and D. Terry, "Epidemic algorithms for replicated database maintenance," in Proc. 6th Annual ACM Symp. on Principles of Distributed Computing, F. B. Schneider, Ed., New York, NY: ACM Press, 1987, pp. 1–12.
