= List of cluster management software =

List of software for cluster management.

== Free and open source ==
- High-availability cluster
  - Apache Mesos, from the Apache Software Foundation
  - Kubernetes, founded by Google Inc, from the Cloud Native Computing Foundation
  - Heartbeat, from Linux-HA
  - Proxmox
  - Docker Swarm
  - Red Hat cluster suite
  - OpenShift and OKD, from Red Hat
  - Nomad, from HashiCorp
  - Rancher, from Rancher Labs
  - TrinityX, from ClusterVision
  - Corosync Cluster Engine
  - OpenSVC
  - K3s ("Lightweight Kubernetes"), from Rancher Labs
  - Qlustar
  - Confluent (successor of xCAT)
- Non-High-availability cluster
  - Foreman
  - oneSIS
  - OpenHPC
  - OpenSAF, founded by Motorola, from OpenSAF Foundation, implements Service Availability Forum
  - Rocks Cluster Distribution
  - Stacki, from StackIQ
  - Warewulf
  - YARN, distributed with Apache Hadoop
  - xCAT

== Proprietary ==
- Amazon Elastic Container Service
- Aspen Systems Inc - Aspen Cluster Management Environment (ACME)
- Borg, used at Google
- Bright Cluster Manager, from Bright Computing
- ClusterVisor, from Advanced Clustering Technologies
- CycleCloud, from Cycle Computing acquired By Microsoft
- Komodor, Enterprise Kubernetes Management Platform
- Dell/EMC - Remote Cluster Manager (RCM)
- DxEnterprise, from DH2i
- Eviden SafeKit (load balancing, real-time replication and failover on Windows and Linux)
- HPE Performance Cluster Manager - HPCM, from Hewlett Packard Enterprise Company
- IBM PowerHA system mirror
- IBM Tivoli System Automation for Multiplatforms, from IBM
- Microsoft Cluster Server, from Microsoft
- NonStop Kernel suite of software from Hewlett Packard Enterprise Company.
- Twine, from Facebook
- Veritas Cluster Server

== See also ==
- Comparison of cluster software
