= Comparison of cluster software =

The following tables compare general and technical information for notable computer cluster software. This software can be grossly separated in four categories: Job scheduler, nodes management, nodes installation and integrated stack (all the above).

== General information ==
Software	Maintainer	Category	Development status	Latest release	ArchitectureOCS	High-Performance / High-Throughput Computing	License	Platforms supported	Cost	Paid support available
Amoeba			No active development				MIT			
Base One Foundation Component Library							Proprietary			
DIET	INRIA, SysFera, Open Source	All in one			GridRPC, SPMD, Hierarchical and distributed architecture, CORBA	HTC/HPC	CeCILL	Unix-like, Mac OS X, AIX	Free	
DxEnterprise	DH2i	Nodes management	Actively developed	v23.0			Proprietary	Windows 2012R2/2016/2019/2022 and 8+, RHEL 7/8/9, CentOS 7, Ubuntu 16.04/18.04/20.04/22.04, SLES 15.4	Cost	Yes
Enduro/X	Mavimax, Ltd.	Job/Data Scheduler	Actively developed		SOA Grid	HTC/HPC/HA	GPLv2 or Commercial	Linux, FreeBSD, MacOS, Solaris, AIX	Free / Cost	Yes
Ganglia		Monitoring	Actively developed	3.7.6 21 February 2024; 2 years ago			BSD	Unix, Linux, Microsoft Windows NT/XP/2000/2003/2008, FreeBSD, NetBSD, OpenBSD, DragonflyBSD, Mac OS X, Solaris, AIX, IRIX, Tru64, HPUX.	Free	
Grid MP	Univa (formerly United Devices)	Job Scheduler	No active development		Distributed master/worker	HTC/HPC	Proprietary	Windows, Linux, Mac OS X, Solaris	Cost	
Apache Mesos	Apache		Retired in August 2025				Apache license v2.0	Linux	Free	Yes
Moab Cluster Suite	Adaptive Computing	Job Scheduler	Actively developed			HPC	Proprietary	Linux, Mac OS X, Windows, AIX, OSF/Tru-64, Solaris, HP-UX, IRIX, FreeBSD & other UNIX platforms	Cost	Yes
NetworkComputer	Runtime Design Automation		Actively developed			HTC/HPC	Proprietary	Unix-like, Windows	Cost	
OpenClusterScheduler	Open Cluster Scheduler	all in one	Actively developed	9.0.8 October 1, 2025; 6 months ago		HTC/HPC	SISSL / Apache License	Linux (distribution independent / CentOS 7 to Ubuntu 24.04), FreeBSD, Solaris	Free	Yes
OpenHPC	OpenHPC project	all in one	Actively developed	v2.61 February 2, 2023; 3 years ago		HPC		Linux (CentOS / OpenSUSE Leap)	Free	No
OpenLava	None. Formerly Teraproc	Job Scheduler	Halted by injunction		Master/Worker, multiple admin/submit nodes	HTC/HPC	Illegal due to being a pirated version of IBM Spectrum LSF	Linux	Not legally available	No
PBS Pro	Altair	Job Scheduler	Actively developed		Master/worker distributed with fail-over	HPC/HTC	AGPL or Proprietary	Linux, Windows	Free or Cost	Yes
Proxmox Virtual Environment	Proxmox Server Solutions	Complete	Actively developed				AGPL v3	Linux, Windows, other operating systems are known to work and are community supported	Free	Yes
Rocks Cluster Distribution	Open Source/NSF grant	All in one	Actively developed	7.0 (Manzanita) 1 December 2017; 8 years ago		HTC/HPC	Open source	CentOS	Free	
Popular Power										
ProActive	INRIA, ActiveEon, Open Source	All in one	Actively developed		Master/Worker, SPMD, Distributed Component Model, Skeletons	HTC/HPC	GNU GPL	Unix-like, Windows, Mac OS X	Free	
RPyC	Tomer Filiba		Actively developed				MIT License	*nix/Windows	Free	
SLURM	SchedMD	Job Scheduler	Actively developed	v23.11.3 January 24, 2024; 2 years ago		HPC/HTC	GNU GPL	Linux/*nix	Free	Yes
Spectrum LSF	IBM	Job Scheduler	Actively developed		Master node with failover/exec clients, multiple admin/submit nodes, Suite addOns	HPC/HTC	Proprietary	Unix, Linux, Windows	Cost and Academic - model - Academic, Express, Standard, Advanced and Suites	Yes
Oracle Grid Engine (Sun Grid Engine, SGE)	Altair	Job Scheduler	active Development moved to Altair Grid Engine		Master node/exec clients, multiple admin/submit nodes	HPC/HTC	Proprietary	*nix/Windows	Cost	
Some Grid Engine / Son of Grid Engine / Sun Grid Engine	daimh	Job Scheduler	Actively developed (stable/maintenance)		Master node/exec clients, multiple admin/submit nodes	HPC/HTC	SISSL	*nix	Free	No
SynfiniWay	Fujitsu		Actively developed			HPC/HTC	?	Unix, Linux, Windows	Cost	
Techila Distributed Computing Engine	Techila Technologies Ltd.	All in one	Actively developed		Master/worker distributed	HTC	Proprietary	Linux, Windows	Cost	Yes
TORQUE Resource Manager	Adaptive Computing	Job Scheduler	Actively developed				Proprietary	Linux, *nix	Cost	Yes
TrinityX	ClusterVision	All in one	Actively developed	v15 February 27, 2025; 13 months ago		HPC/HTC	GNU GPL v3	Linux/*nix	Free	Yes
UniCluster	Univa	All in One	Functionality and development moved to UniCloud (see above)						Free	Yes
UNICORE										
Xgrid	Apple Computer									
Warewulf		Provision and clusters management	Actively developed	v4.6.4 September 5, 2025; 7 months ago		HPC	Open source	Linux	Free	
xCAT		Provision and clusters management	Actively developed	v2.17.0 November 13, 2024; 17 months ago		HPC	Eclipse Public License	Linux	Free	
Software	Maintainer	Category	Development status	Latest release	Architecture	High-Performance/ High-Throughput Computing	License	Platforms supported	Cost	Paid support available

Table explanation

- Software: The name of the application that is described

== Technical information ==
Software	Implementation Language	Authentication	Encryption	Integrity	Global File System	Global File System + Kerberos	Heterogeneous/ Homogeneous exec node	Jobs priority	Group priority	Queue type	SMP aware	Max exec node	Max job submitted	CPU scavenging	Parallel job	Job checkpointing	Python interface
Enduro/X	C/C++	OS Authentication	GPG, AES-128, SHA1	None	Any cluster Posix FS (gfs, gpfs, ocfs, etc.)	Any cluster Posix FS (gfs, gpfs, ocfs, etc.)	Heterogeneous	OS Nice level	OS Nice level	SOA Queues, FIFO	Yes	OS Limits	OS Limits	Yes	Yes	No	No
HTCondor	C++	GSI, SSL, Kerberos, Password, File System, Remote File System, Windows, Claim To Be, Anonymous	None, Triple DES, BLOWFISH	None, MD5	None, NFS, AFS	Not official, hack with ACL and NFS4	Heterogeneous	Yes	Yes	Fair-share with some programmability	basic (hard separation into different node)	tested ~10000?	tested ~100000?	Yes	MPI, OpenMP, PVM	Yes	Yes
PBS Pro	C/Python	OS Authentication, Munge			Any, e.g., NFS, Lustre, GPFS, AFS	Limited availability	Heterogeneous	Yes	Yes	Fully configurable	Yes	tested ~50,000	Millions	Yes	MPI, OpenMP	Yes	Yes
OpenLava	C/C++	OS authentication	None		NFS		Heterogeneous Linux	Yes	Yes	Configurable	Yes			Yes, supports preemption based on priority	Yes	Yes	No
Slurm	C	Munge, None, Kerberos					Heterogeneous	Yes	Yes	Multifactor Fair-share	Yes	tested 120k	tested 100k	No	Yes	Yes	Yes
Spectrum LSF	C/C++	Multiple - OS Authentication/Kerberos	Optional	Optional	Any - GPFS/Spectrum Scale, NFS, SMB	Any - GPFS/Spectrum Scale, NFS, SMB	Heterogeneous - HW and OS agnostic (AIX, Linux or Windows)	Policy based - no queue to computenode binding	Policy based - no queue to computegroup binding	Batch, interactive, checkpointing, parallel and combinations	Yes and GPU aware (GPU License free)	> 9.000 compute hots	> 4 mio jobs a day	Yes, supports preemption based on priority, supports checkpointing/resume	Yes, fx parallel submissions for job collaboration over fx MPI	Yes, with support for user, kernel or library level checkpointing environments	Yes
Torque	C	SSH, munge			None, any		Heterogeneous	Yes	Yes	Programmable	Yes	tested	tested	Yes	Yes	Yes	Yes
Software	Implementation Language	Authentication	Encryption	Integrity	Global File System	Global File System + Kerberos	Heterogeneous/ Homogeneous exec node	Jobs priority	Group priority	Queue type	SMP aware	Max exec node	Max job submitted	CPU scavenging	Parallel job	Job checkpointing	Python interface

Table Explanation

- Software: The name of the application that is described
- SMP aware:
  - basic: hard split into multiple virtual host
  - basic+: hard split into multiple virtual host with some minimal/incomplete communication between virtual host on the same computer
  - dynamic: split the resource of the computer (CPU/Ram) on demand

== See also ==
- List of volunteer computing projects
- List of cluster management software
- Computer cluster
- Grid computing
- World Community Grid
- Distributed computing
- Distributed resource management
- High-Throughput Computing
- Job Processing Cycle
- Batch processing
- Fallacies of Distributed Computing
