= Borg (cluster manager) =

Cluster manager designed by Google

Borg is a cluster manager used by Google since 2008 or earlier. It led to widespread use of similar approaches, such as Docker and Kubernetes.

Its predecessor system within Google was called Omega, although both systems were kept in use.

Twitter developed the open-source Apache Mesos cluster manager based on Borg.

Google released traces from Borg in 2011 and 2020 for the purpose of academic research.

== See also ==
- List of cluster management software
- Kubernetes
- OS-level virtualization (containerization)
- Paxos (computer science)
