= InfraKit =

- Developer: Docker, Inc.
- Release: 4 October 2016; 10 years ago
- Written in: Go
- Operating system: Linux
- Platform: x86-64
- Type: OS-level virtualization
- License: Apache License 2.0
- Website: github.com/docker-archive/deploykit
- Repository: github.com/docker-archive/deploykit

InfraKit is an open-source project that is part of the larger Docker application container software project. The project was formally announced for Docker by its creator Solomon Hykes at the Linuxcon EU 2016 event. InfraKit was originally called 'libmachete' and was renamed by Docker developers in October 2016.

According to the project's GitHub description, InfraKit is a toolkit for creating and managing declarative, self-healing infrastructure. InfraKit consists of several core elements which include, instances, groups and flavors. Groups are collections of instances while flavors are specific groups built for a certain purpose. The InfraKit model works as a set of plugins that can be used to monitor Docker infrastructure. In the event of a failure or a node falling out of a set policy, the self-healing element of InfraKit enables remediation.

On January 21, 2020, the GitHub repository was archived and since January 27, 2025, Docker states:

InfraKit[...] has been archived, and users are encouraged to explore tools such as Terraform for infrastructure provisioning and orchestration.
