= OpenHPC =

Set of FOSS tools for Linux based HPC

- Initial release: November 12, 2015; 9 years ago
- Stable release: 2.4 (November 16, 2021; 3 years ago) [±]
- Repository: https://github.com/openhpc
- Operating system: AlmaLinux, CentOS, SUSE Linux Enterprise Server, OpenSUSE Leap, Rocky Linux
- Platform: x86-64, AArch64
- Type: Cluster software
- License: Free software (Apache and other licenses)
- Website: openhpc.community

OpenHPC is a set of community-driven FOSS tools for Linux based HPC. OpenHPC does not have specific hardware requirements.

== History ==
A birds-of-a-feather panel discussion titled "Community Supported HPC Repository & Management Framework" convened at the 2015 edition of the International Supercomputing Conference. The panel discussed the common software components necessary to build linux compute clusters and solicited feedback on community interest in such a project. Following the response, the OpenHPC project was announced at SC 2015 under the auspices of the Linux Foundation.

=== Releases ===
Version	Date
2.61	February 2, 2023
2.4	November 16, 2021
2.1	April 6, 2021
2.0	October 6, 2020
1.3.9	November 12, 2019
1.3.8	June 11, 2019
1.3.7	March 14, 2019
1.3.6	November 07, 2018
1.3.5	June 13, 2018
1.3.4	April 02, 2018
1.3.3	November 08, 2017
1.3.2	September 07, 2017
1.3.1	June 16, 2017
1.3	March 31, 2017
1.2.1	January 24, 2017
1.2	November 12, 2016
1.1.1	June 21, 2016
1.1	April 18, 2016
1.0.1	February 05, 2016
1.0	November 12, 2015

== Design ==
OpenHPC provides an integrated and tested collection of software components that, along with a supported standard Linux distribution, can be used to implement a full-featured compute cluster. Components span the entire HPC software ecosystem including provisioning and system administration tools, resource management, I/O services, development tools, numerical libraries, and performance analysis tools. The architecture of OpenHPC is intentionally modular to allow end users to pick and choose from the provided components, as well as to foster a community of open contribution. The project provides recipes for building clusters using CentOS (v8.3) and openSUSE Leap (v15.2) on x86_64 as well as aarch64 architectures.

== See also ==
- Cluster manager
- Comparison of cluster software
- List of cluster management software
