= Mirantis =

Cloud computing software and services company

Mirantis Inc
- Industry: Cloud computing
- Founded: 1999; 27 years ago
- Founder: Alex Freedland; Boris Renski
- Headquarters: Campbell, California
- Key people: Alex Freedland CEO; Shaun O’Meara (CTO); Richard Borenstein (SVP); Kevin Kamel (VP)
- Products: Mirantis Kubernetes Engine; Mirantis Container Runtime; Mirantis OpenStack for Kubernetes; Mirantis k0rdent AI Enterprise; Mirantis k0rdent AI Provider
- Parent: IREN (2026)
- Website: www.mirantis.com

Mirantis Inc., a subsidiary of IREN, headquartered in Campbell, California, provides B2B open source cloud computing software and services. The company focuses on the development and support of AI infrastructure management platforms and container and cloud infrastructure management platforms based on Kubernetes and OpenStack. Its primary products, part of the Mirantis Cloud Native Platform suite of products, are Mirantis Container Cloud and Mirantis Kubernetes Engine.

The company was acquired by IREN in August 2026.

== History ==
The company was founded in 1999 by Alex Freedland and Boris Renski. It was one of the founding members of the OpenStack Foundation, a non-profit corporate entity established in September 2012 to promote OpenStack software and its community. Mirantis has been an active member of the Cloud Native Computing Foundation since 2016.

Mirantis initially specialized in working with clients to build out open private, public, and service-provider cloud platforms based on OpenStack, using open source tools to integrate the computing, network and storage capabilities which define OpenStack infrastructure.

In April 2016, Volkswagen signed a deal to use Mirantis's software in all of its data centers.

In April 2017, the company transitioned to Kubernetes-based container and cloud infrastructure platforms, with the launch of Mirantis Cloud Platform, which includes a containerized version of OpenStack.

In 2025, Mirantis introduced offerings for multi-cluster Kubernetes management and AI infrastructure management, which use the open source k0rdent project, which the company originated. In October 2025, Mirantis announced an integration with Nvidia BlueField DPUs to enhance performance, security, and observability for AI workloads. Mirantis was also named a collaborator in the NVIDIA AI Factory for Government initiative, supporting secure and compliant AI infrastructure for public-sector use cases.

=== OpenStack ===
In October 2013, Mirantis launched its own OpenStack distribution, which works with various operating systems, including Red Hat, CentOS, and Ubuntu Linux.

Other delivery form-factors for Mirantis OpenStack include the Mirantis NFV Reference Platform, a reference architecture for Mirantis OpenStack designed to efficiently host, orchestrate and scale virtualized network functions in ways compatible with the ETSI-NFV specification.

Mirantis Unlocked Appliances, first offered in July 2015, were turn-key, scalable modular racks, with Mirantis OpenStack pre-installed and pre-tested on select hardware in reference configurations optimized for different workload types, sold and supported in collaboration with Mirantis Certified Rack Partners. The first Unlocked Appliance, for Cloud Native Apps, incorporated hardware and software from Dell, Juniper and Intel.

In October 2019, Mirantis became the official administrator of the Certified OpenStack Administrator program on behalf of the OpenStack Foundation.

In December 2020, Mirantis announced the release of Mirantis OpenStack for Kubernetes, a containerized edition of the open source Infrastructure-as-a-Service platform, as part of its Mirantis Cloud Native Platform.

=== Kubernetes ===
In 2015, Mirantis partnered with Google to integrate Kubernetes and OpenStack, using OpenStack Murano application catalog technology.

Mirantis debuted its first Kubernetes-related offering in December 2016, when it introduced vendor-agnostic training and certification for the Kubernetes and Docker containerization via OS-level virtualization.

The company released Mirantis Cloud Platform, which combines OpenStack with Kubernetes and follows a build-operate-transfer delivery model in April 2017.

Mirantis Cloud Platform utilizes a continuous integration / continuous delivery toolchain, known as DriveTrain, to perform continuous incremental updates and eliminate the need for major upgrades of the platform.

Mirantis announced Mirantis Cloud Platform Containers-as-a-Service, which enables users to provision Kubernetes clusters across multiple clouds on private infrastructure and/or public clouds including Amazon Web Services, in September 2017.

With the addition of Containers-as-a-Service, Mirantis Cloud Platform supports hybrid clouds, with DriveTrain providing "consistent tooling for managing the lifecycle of OpenStack, Kubernetes on-premises and on AWS."

Mirantis launched Mirantis Application Platform, a continuous delivery platform for Kubernetes, in April 2018.

Mirantis edge computing platform, launched in October 2018, is based on Kubernetes and targeted towards telecommunications providers.

In May 2019, the company announced its "Bring Your Own Distribution" initiative, which offers enterprise support for multiple Kubernetes distributions, targeting organizations that have already deployed Kubernetes in production, including many who have been "extending Kubernetes in a way that makes it challenging for IT operations teams to support."

In November 2019, the company acquired the Docker Enterprise business, known for kick-starting the software container movement, to support Mirantis' vision of providing a "cloud native stack, powered by Kubernetes, delivered as a service."

In February 2020, Mirantis hired a team of Kubernetes experts from Kontena, a Finnish company that developed the Pharos distribution of Kubernetes.

In September 2020, Mirantis announced the release of Mirantis Container Cloud (originally known as Docker Enterprise Container Cloud), which provides multi-cloud and multi-cluster management capabilities across public and private clouds.

In February 2025, Mirantis introduced k0rdent, an open source composable Kubernetes management platform designed to simplify multi-cluster, multi-cloud Kubernetes platform engineering and AI/ML workload orchestration.

k0rdent AI, an enterprise AI lifecycle management solution, further supports the deployment and management of AI applications with composable AI infrastructure.

=== Contributions to OpenStack ===
Alex Freedland and Boris Renski, the founders of Mirantis, have served on the OpenStack Foundation board of directors.

Mirantis has been a major contributor of code to OpenStack, ranking 3rd all time by both commits and lines of code.

Mirantis contributes to many core OpenStack projects and during the Mitaka and Newton releases, the company led projects in OpenStack core and Big Tent, including:

- Fuel, an OpenStack project under Big Tent, is a toolkit for deploying and managing OpenStack clouds. Fuel allows deployment, configuration, and validation of infrastructure features through a graphical interface; it allows users to choose which OpenStack components to run.
- Project Murano, an OpenStack application catalog project developed by Mirantis and other members of the OpenStack community. Murano attempts to address the challenge of installing third party services and applications in a dynamic OpenStack environment by offering a catalog of applications fully defined for automated deployment.
- Sahara, an OpenStack project that simplifies creation of Hadoop clusters, originated by the Apache Software Foundation and OpenStack Foundation members, is contributed to by Mirantis in collaboration with Red Hat and Hortonworks.
- Rally, an OpenStack project that benchmarks performance of OpenStack clouds, is contributed to by Mirantis.

Mirantis was one of the largest code-contributors to OpenStack Newton by lines of code.

By 2016, Mirantis started becoming a significant contributor of code to other open infrastructure-related projects as well, including Kubernetes, Ceph, OpenContrail, Prometheus, and OPNFV.

In 2019, Mirantis joined OpenStack Foundation's Airship, "an open source project for automating the provisioning of clouds, as part of an effort to accelerate deployment of Kubernetes on bare-metal servers that AT&T will employ to drive 5G networking services."

=== Leadership ===
In January 2018, Adrian Ionel returned as CEO of the company, replacing co-founder Alex Freedland.

In March 2020, co-founder Boris Renski left the company.

In January 2024, Alex Freedland returned as CEO.

=== Funding ===
In January 2013, Mirantis raised $10 million in funding from Intel Capital and WestSummit Capital,

It raised another $10 million from Red Hat, Ericsson and Sapphire Ventures in June 2013.

In October 2014, Mirantis raised $100 million in a Series B financing round led by Insight Venture Partners, and joined by existing investors Intel Capital, WestSummit Capital, Telefonaktiebolaget L.M. Ericsson and Sapphire Ventures.

In August 2015, Intel led an additional $100 million funding round with new investor Goldman Sachs and existing investors August Capital, Insight Venture Partners, Ericsson, Sapphire Ventures and WestSummit Capital.

In August 2026, IREN acquired Mirantis for 12.6 million shares of IREN and about $40 million in cash.

=== Acquisitions ===
In September 2016, Mirantis acquired TCP Cloud, a Czech startup that developed managed services for OpenStack, for $30 million.

In November 2019, Mirantis acquired Docker Enterprise Technology Platform and all associated IP: Docker Enterprise Engine, Docker Trusted Registry, Docker Unified Control Plane and Docker CLI from Docker, Inc.

In August 2020, Mirantis acquired Lens, an open source Integrated Development Environment for Kubernetes, from Kontena, the Finnish company that originally developed Lens.

In July 2022, Mirantis acquired Amazee.io, developer of Lagoon, an open source application delivery platform for Kubernetes.

In January 2023, Mirantis acquired Shipa, a company that builds tools to help developers develop, deploy and manage cloud-native applications.
