= Stratoscale =

Data center software solution provider with hyperconverged infrastructure

- Type: Private
- Industry: Cloud computing
- Founded: 2013
- Founder: Ariel Maislos
- Headquarters: Herzliya, Israel
- Website: www.stratoscale.com

Stratoscale was a software company offering software-defined data center technology, with hyper-converged infrastructure and cloud computing capabilities. Stratoscale combined compute, storage, and networking hardware with no additional third party software. Stratoscale has shut down with no details for the future of its products.

== History ==
Stratoscale was founded in 2013 by Ariel Maislos. Stratoscale is headquartered in Israel with offices in Herzliya and Haifa, and offices in North America in Sunnyvale, California, Boston, Massachusetts, and New York City, New York. Stratoscale announced Stratoscale Symphony, in December 2015, selling through channel partners.

Stratoscale raised $70 million from Battery Ventures, Bessemer Venture Partners, Intel Capital, Cisco, Leslie Ventures, Qualcomm Ventures, and SanDisk.

The company shut down at the end of 2019 due to lack of funding.

== Products ==
Stratoscale Symphony was marketed for software-defined data centers or hyper-converged infrastructure. The software was intended to work on customers' hardware. Stratoscale Symphony was available on subscription basis. The Symphony suite could be deployed on commodity x86 servers to provide an Amazon Web Services (AWS) capability with the capacity to augment legacy VMware. In 2016, Stratoscale released Symphony 3.

== Partner program ==
Stratoscale had channel partners, technology partners, and system partners. Channel partners consisted of resellers, integrators, and distributors. Technology partners included CloudEndure, Cloudera, Docker, Hortonworks, Intel, Mellanox Technologies, Midokura, OpenStack, and SanDisk. System partners included Cisco, Hewlett Packard Enterprise (HPE), Infinidat, Lenovo, and Supermicro.
