= Private cloud computing infrastructure =

Type of cloud computing

Private cloud computing infrastructure is a category of cloud computing that provides comparable benefits to public cloud systems, such as self-service and scalability, but it does so via a proprietary framework. In contrast to public clouds, which cater to multiple entities, a private cloud is specifically designed for the requirements and objectives of one organization.

== Definition ==
A private cloud computing infrastructure constitutes a distinctive model of cloud computing that facilitates a secure and distinct cloud environment where only the intended client can function. It can either be physically housed in the organization's in-house data center or be managed by a third-party provider. In a private cloud, the infrastructure and services are always sustained on a private network, and both the hardware and software are devoted exclusively to a single organization.

== History ==
The concept of private cloud infrastructure started to take shape around the mid-2000s, coinciding with the rise of other cloud computing forms. It came into existence as a solution to the shortcomings of public clouds, particularly concerns over data control, security, and network performance. IT departments began to mirror the automation and self-service features of the public cloud in their data centers. Over time, these services became more advanced, and private cloud technology has been refined to address businesses and organizations' diverse needs.

== Architecture ==
Private cloud computing infrastructure generally involves a mix of hardware, network infrastructure, and virtualization software.

- The hardware, often referred to as a cloud server or cloud array, consists of a server rack or a collection of server racks containing the storage and processors that constitute the cloud.
- The virtualization software, such as Hyper-V, OpenStack, or VMWare, establishes and oversees virtual machines with which users interact.
- The network infrastructure connects the private cloud to users and may facilitate connectivity with other on-premises data centers or clouds.

== Applications ==
Private cloud infrastructures are usually utilized by medium to large businesses and organizations that need robust control over their data, have extensive computing needs, or have specific regulatory or compliance obligations. This includes healthcare organizations, government agencies, financial institutions, and any business that needs to process and store large data volumes.

== See also ==
- Cloud computing
- Edge Computing
