= CloudControl =

European cloud computing company

cloudControl GmbH
- Type: Private
- Industry: Cloud platform as a service
- Founded: January 2009
- Founder: Philipp Strube, Tobias Wilken, Thomas Ruland
- Headquarters: Berlin, Germany
- Key people: Günter Kraft, Peter Elsayeh, Thomas Ludwig, Philipp Möhring
- Website: www.cloudcontrol.com

cloudControl was a European company offering a platform as a service (PaaS) based in Berlin, Germany. Officially supported languages for development and deployment were Java, PHP, Python and Ruby via the open buildpack API originally developed by Heroku.

== History ==
cloudControl was founded in January 2009 by Philipp Strube, Tobias Wilken and Thomas Ruland in Bonn, Germany. The company moved to the Berlin, Germany area in early 2010 after getting business angel investor funding. Production support for the PHP programming language was announced in October 2010. The company raised venture capital funding August 2011. As a result of this, support for Java, Python and Ruby programming languages started in October 2012.

=== dotCloud ===
In August 2014 it acquired the dotCloud brand from American company Docker, Inc. dotCloud was a platform as a service company using the open-source Docker software; it was the original developer of Docker.

In January 2016 the company sent out a letter to its customers that it was shutting down.

Unfortunately I have to inform you, that cloudControl our German parent company has filed for bankruptcy. Due to this, dotCloud will be shutdown [sic] on February 29, 2016. To avoid service disruption of your apps hosted on dotCloud or prevent data loss, you are required to migrate your applications.

=== Bankruptcy ===
cloudControl went bankrupt in December 2015 and was acquired by Exoscale in March 2016. The dotCloud service was shut down the same time.
