= Nebula (computing platform) =

Federal cloud computing platform

NASA Nebula
- Developer: NASA
- Operating system: Any (web-based application)
- Type: Web development
- Website: nebula.nasa.gov

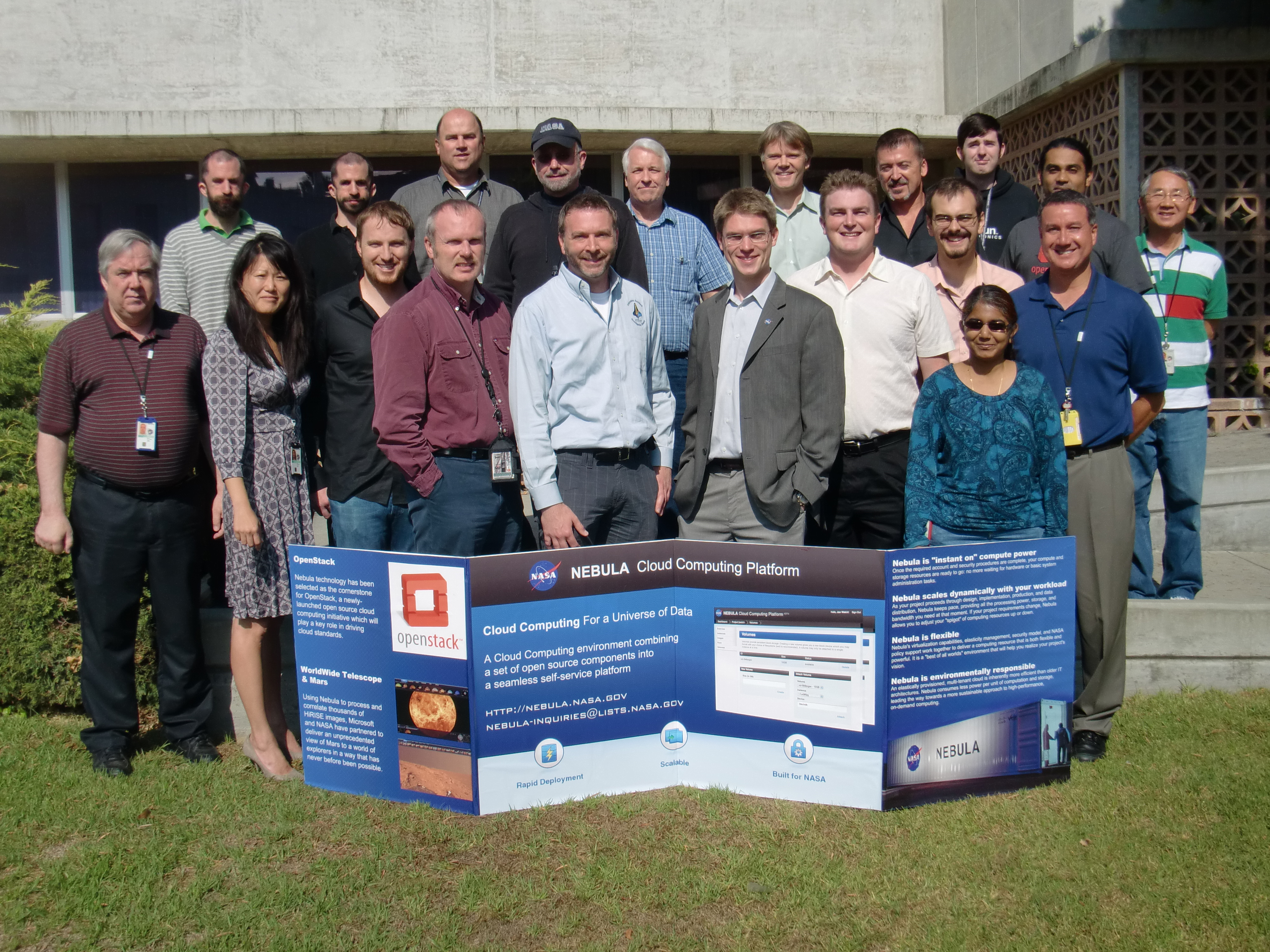
Nebula Team 2010

Nebula is a federal cloud computing platform that originated at NASA Ames Research Center at Moffett Field, California. Nebula hosted many advanced research projects. One application Open Sourced by NASA and developed by the Nebula project, Nova, became one of the two founding projects of the OpenStack project.

== History ==
The Ames Internet Exchange (AIX), was formerly MAE-West, one of the original nodes of the Internet, and is a major peering location for Tier 1 ISPs, as well as being the home of the "E" root name servers. The AIX provides connectivity to the Nebula Cloud, enabling 10 Gigabit Ethernet connections to NISN.

The Nebula-Project uses a variety of free and open-source software.

== See also ==
- Eucalyptus (computing)
- Ganeti
