= StackEngine =

StackEngine was founded in Austin, Texas in 2014 to build enterprise-grade container management and automation products to help organizations simply deploy, manage, and scale resilient applications. It was designed as a Docker management software product to provide an integrated DevOps solution for end-to-end container application delivery and operations. StackEngine was acquired by Oracle in December 2015.

== History ==
StackEngine was founded in May 2014 by Eric Anderson, Robert Gordon, and Bob Quillin. As an early mover in the Docker management marketplace, StackEngine built enterprise-grade container management and automation products that helped organizations simply deploy, manage, and scale resilient applications. Silverton Partners and Live Oak Venture Partners both led the StackEngine seed investment and Series A rounds. The company launched out of stealth October 2014 to focus on products to address Docker operations.

== Product ==
The StackEngine model-based Docker management software provided an integrated DevOps solution for end-to-end container application delivery and operation, all with an integrated GUI dashboard, service discovery, scheduling, and orchestration functions. StackEngine could be deployed into any on-premises, hybrid, public, or private cloud environments and scaled across thousands of hosts enabling users to start in the lab and scale out to full production.

StackEngine launched the Container Application Center in June 2016 to eliminate the Docker operations bottleneck by helping ops teams (1) bootstrap Docker into production; (2) discover, visualize, and orchestrate small to large scale Docker deployments; and (3) intelligently automate change and configuration management for containers.

StackEngine focused on automation as the answer. Containerization instantly shifted the problem up the stack away from low-level system configuration tools to application-level container management tools. With StackEngine, the product was designed to help deliver product faster, deploy more frequently, operate more reliably, and run wherever was most optimal.

== Oracle Acquisition ==
On December 18, 2015, Oracle signed and closed an agreement to acquire StackEngine. All StackEngine employees joined Oracle as part of Oracle Cloud. Oracle announced the Oracle Container Cloud Service – based on the StackEngine technology and built by the StackEngine team – at Oracle OpenWorld 2016.
