= IREN =

Australian data centre company

IREN Ltd.
- Type: Public company
- Traded as: Nasdaq: IREN
- Industry: Data centers, cloud computing, Bitcoin mining
- Founded: 6 November 2018
- Headquarters: Sydney, Australia
- Key people: Daniel Roberts and Will Roberts, co-CEOs; Anthony Lewis, CFO
- Revenue: ▲US$501 million (2025)
- Net income: ▲US$86 million (2025)
- Total assets: ▲US$2.940 billion (2025)
- Total equity: ▲US$1.817 billion (2025)
- Website: iren.com

IREN Ltd (formerly Iris Energy Ltd), headquartered in Sydney, New South Wales, Australia, provides cloud computing infrastructure and services for artificial intelligence (AI). The company develops, owns and operates data centres and provides GPU computing, software and managed services for training and running AI models. As of August 2026, IREN reported a global data centre development pipeline exceeding 5 GW, with projects across North America, Europe and Australia. The company locates its facilities in regions with substantial renewable electricity generation and purchases renewable energy certificates to match its electricity consumption. IREN also operates Bitcoin mining facilities, which it is progressively converting to support its expanding AI cloud business.

== History ==
The company was founded in Sydney on 6 November 2018 by Daniel and William Roberts as Iris Energy Limited. The company originated from the brothers' interest in Bitcoin and the idea of making energy-intensive Bitcoin mining more sustainable. The company then acquired a data centre complex in Canal Flats, British Columbia, Canada, which was connected to a former saw mill.

In March 2021, the company raised A$40 million.

In November 2021, the company became a public company via an initial public offering on the Nasdaq, raising approximately US$232 million.

In November 2024, the company changed its name from Iris Energy Ltd to IREN Ltd.

In November 2025, the company received a US$9.7 billion contract from Microsoft to provide computing power.

In March 2026, IREN ordered more than 50,000 Nvidia GPUs, increasing its total capacity to 150,000 GPUs.

In May 2026, the company entered into an agreement with Nvidia under which IREN will provide Nvidia with access to managed GPU cloud services for its internal AI and research workloads via its data centre in Childress, Texas, drawing on 60 MW of existing capacity. Nvidia received a five-year right to purchase up to 30 million shares of IREN at $70 per share.

In August 2026, the company acquired Mirantis for 12.6 million shares of IREN and about $40 million in cash.

== Sponsorships ==
In 2026, the company became the jersey patch sponsor for the Golden State Warriors.

== Legal issues ==
In October 2024, an investor filed a lawsuit against the company in New York alleging that IREN made misleading statements to investors regarding its high-performance computing capabilities, in particular that its data centre in Childress, Texas, was not suitable for demanding HPC applications despite being marketed as such. The complaint alleged that key infrastructure, including backup power lines and cooling systems, was lacking and described statements by management as misleading.

A class action was filed after the IPO by shareholders who alleged that the company failed to disclose material risks, including risks related to debt. In September 2024, a United States court dismissed the lawsuit, finding that there was no sufficient evidence of intentional misrepresentation.
