= Stacki =

- Repository: github.com/Teradata/stacki
- Written in: Python
- License: BSD 3-clause license

Stacki is a computer cluster software product from the company StackIQ, released as open-source software.

== Description ==
StackIQ was originally named Clustercorp when it was founded in 2006. Its first product was a commercial version of a Linux distribution called the Rocks Cluster Distribution. Originally based in San Jose, California, co-founders included Mason Katz and chief executive Tim McIntire. In 2011, the company re-incorporated as StackIQ and moved to the La Jolla district in San Diego, California. A round of venture capital funding in April and October 2014 raised about $6 million. By then it was located in Solana Beach, California. In August 2016, Pervez Choudhry replaced McIntire as chief executive.

A product called StackIQ cluster manager was renamed StackIQ Boss in February 2015.

Stacki works on several servers at the same time, so it takes about as long to provision any number of servers.

The system allows installations via the Preboot Execution Environment (PXE), and supports both an “all servers that boot on this network” and an “all servers in this spreadsheet” method of installations. So if the servers to be installed are on an isolated network, a Stacki tool called insert-ethers can be run to grab each machine that boots on the network and add it to Stacki, commencing an installation if needed. If the servers to be installed are on a shared network, then loading a spreadsheet of machines to install tells Stacki which ones it should install.

Stacki uses a database to manage variables for use during installation. Variables can be defined by individual server, installation type, or globally, and can be manipulated via spreadsheets or command line. Networking, for example, can be managed with variables. A machine can be configured with multiple network cards on multiple networks with varying routes and open/closed ports. Stacki was released in June 2015.

The StackIQ company was acquired by Teradata on June 30, 2017, for an undisclosed amount.
