= OneSIS =

Software

oneSIS is an open-source software tool developed at Sandia National Laboratories aimed at easing systems administration in large-scale, Linux cluster environments.

The official tag line for oneSIS is that it is a thin, role-based Single Image System for scalable cluster management. oneSIS is a simple and highly extensible method for deploying and managing one or more root images of supported Linux distributions into a master image used as the root of diskless nodes. A single image can serve thousands of nodes.

== Using oneSIS ==
oneSIS requires functional infrastructure, such as DHCP, PXE, and NFSroot; see HOWTO. Sysadmin has to determine which machine will serve as the source for the image that will eventually be deployed to the remaining machines in the cluster.

One of the easy-to-use conventions of oneSIS is that all configuration settings for all nodes within a cluster are controlled by a single file on the master node, /etc/sysimage. This file is used to list the machines in the cluster, define which machines belong to what class, and explains which classes boot which images from the NFSroot server and how their configuration settings differ. Changes applied to the master images appear instantly to the nodes using said images. Changing a node to boot into a different image only requires a quick modification to /etc/sysimage and a reboot of the target client. Since oneSIS was designed with the Linux-systems administrator in mind, users will not find proprietary-GUI frontends here; all the tools to image a box, copying root-images, converting diskless machines diskfull, etc. are accessible exclusively through the command line interface (CLI). The goal is to let Linux systems administrators feel at home with the typical CLI tools they're already used to.

OneSIS benefits include:

- Overall system complexity and administration overhead is reduced.
- Potentially more stable and secure environment because sysadmins concentrate on hardening single images.
- Images can be deployed in diskless and diskfull environments.
- Uses standard tools and settings found in any Linux distribution and the open Linux kernel source.
- Scalability.
- Possibilities for load balancing and failover support.

== See also ==
- Warewulf -- a similar diskless cluster package
