= Altair Accelerator =

Scheduling software

NetworkComputer
- Developer: Altair Engineering
- Stable release: 2019.01 / 2019
- Operating system: Cross-platform
- Type: job scheduler
- Website: Altair Engineering – Accelerator Page

Altair Accelerator, previously known as NetworkComputer (NC), is a commercial job scheduler developed by Altair Engineering. The product was originally developed by Runtime Design Automation (RTDA) before Altair acquired the company.

Accelerator is used to manage a computer farm or computer cluster and is responsible for accepting, scheduling, dispatching, and managing the remote execution of standalone, parallel, or interactive user jobs. It also manages the allocation of resources such as processors, memory, disk space, software licenses, and custom objects to jobs that require them.

Accelerator uses a unique event-driven scheduler that results in very low overhead per job, usually in the millisecond range.

== Features ==
- Web interface for administrators and users
- Native command execution and scripting support
- Job throttling based upon resource availability (CPU, RAM, licenses, etc.)

Accelerator runs on multiple platforms, including Linux, macOS, Microsoft Windows.
