= Warewulf =

Computer cluster implementation toolkit

Warewulf is a computer cluster implementation toolkit that facilitates the process of installing a cluster and long term administration.

== Toolkit ==
Warewulf does this by changing the administration paradigm to make all of the slave node file systems manageable from one point, and automate the distribution of the node file system during node boot. It allows a central administration model for all slave nodes and includes the tools needed to build configuration files, monitor, and control the nodes. It is totally customizable and can be adapted to just about any type of cluster. From the software administration perspective it does not make much difference if you are running 2 nodes or 500 nodes. The procedure is still the same, which is why Warewulf is scalable from the admins perspective. Also, because it uses a standard chroot'able file system for every node, it is extremely configurable and lends itself to custom environments very easily.

While Warewulf was designed to be a high-performance computing (HPC) system, it is not an HPC system in itself. Warewulf is more along the lines of a distributed Linux distribution, or more specifically a system for replicating and managing small, lightweight Linux systems from one master. Using Warewulf, HPC packages such as LAM/MPI/MPICH, Sun Grid Engine, PVM, etc. can be easily deployed throughout the cluster.

Warewulf solves the problem of slave node management rather than being a strict HPC specific system (even though it was designed with HPC in mind). Because of this it is as flexible as a home grown cluster, but administratively scales very well. As a result of this flexibility and ease of customization, Warewulf has been used not only on production HPC implementations, but also development systems like KASY0 (the first system to break the one hundred dollar per GFLOPS barrier), and non HPC systems such as web server cluster farms, intrusion detection clusters, and high-availability clusters.

== See also ==
- oneSIS – another diskless cluster package
- xCAT – Extreme Cloud Administration Toolkit – offers complete management for HPC clusters, RenderFarms, Grids, WebFarms, Online Gaming Infrastructure, Clouds, Datacenters
