= Software Magazine =

Software Magazine is a software and Information technology magazine. It is owned and published by Rockport Custom Publishing, based in Beverly, Massachusetts, on a monthly basis.

Software 500 survey can be used to gauge the value of the commercial software industry. The survey consists of data of the top 500 software companies.
