= XCAT =

Distributed computing management software

- Original author(s): Egan Ford
- Developer(s): Egan Ford, Jarrod Johnson, Bruce Potter, Andy Wray
- Initial release: October 31, 1999
- Stable release: 2.17.0 / November 13, 2024; 5 months ago
- Repository: github.com/xcat2/xcat-core.git
- Written in: Perl, Python, Bash
- Operating system: Linux, IBM AIX, Windows
- Platform: Cross-platform
- Size: 5 MB
- Available in: English
- Type: Distributed computing
- License: Eclipse Public License
- Website: xcat.org

xCAT (Extreme Cloud Administration Toolkit) is open-source distributed computing management software developed by IBM, used for the deployment and administration of Linux or AIX based clusters.

In September 2023 the primary developers of xCAT said that they moved onto other roles and could no longer work on it, asking the community if anyone would like to take over, as otherwise they planned to end-of-life the project on December 1, 2023. A consortium of companies organized to take over the development, later releasing version 2.17.

== Toolkit ==
xCAT can:

- Create and manage diskless clusters
- Install and manage many Linux cluster machines (physical or virtual) in parallel
- Set up a high-performance computing software stack, including software for batch job submission, parallel libraries, and other software that is useful on a cluster
- Cloning and imaging Linux and Windows machines

xCAT has specific features designed to take advantage of IBM hardware including:

- Remote Power Control
- Remote POST/BIOS console
- Serial over LAN functions
- Hardware alerts and vitals provided via SNMP and email
- Inventory and hardware management

xCAT achieved recognition in June 2008 for having been used with the IBM Roadrunner, which set a computing speed record at that time. xCAT is the default systems management tool of the IBM Intelligent Cluster solution.

xCAT is sometimes used by Lenovo, along with their own deployment system, Confluent.
