= Docker, Inc. =

American technology company

- Industry: Computer software
- Predecessor: dotCloud, Inc.
- Founders: Kamel Founadi; Solomon Hykes; Sebastien Pahl
- Headquarters: Palo Alto, California
- Key people: Don Johnson (CEO)
- Products: Docker, Docker Hub
- Website: www.docker.com/company

Docker, Inc. is an American technology company that develops productivity tools built around Docker, which automates the deployment of code inside software containers via OS-level virtualization. Major commercial products of the company are Docker Hub, a central repository of containers, and Docker Desktop, a GUI application for Windows, Linux and macOS to manage containers. The historic offering was Docker Enterprise PaaS business, acquired by Mirantis. The company is also an active contributor to various CNCF projects, such as containerd and runC. The main open source offering of the company are Docker Engine and buildkit, which are rebranded under the Moby umbrella project. The core specification, Dockerfile, still includes the company trademark, however.

== History ==
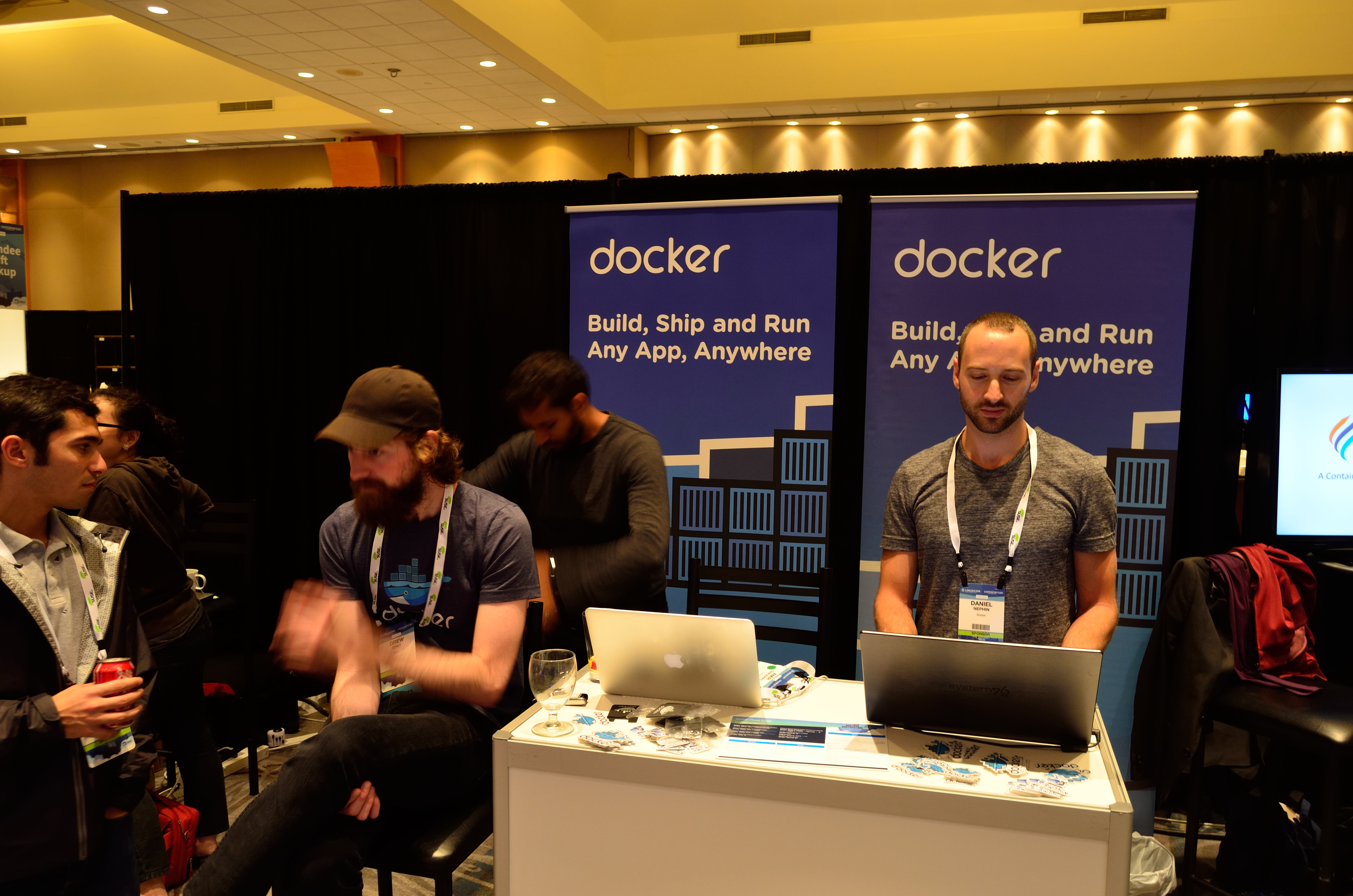
Docker booth at LinuxCon 2016

The company was founded as dotCloud in 2008 by Kamel Founadi, Solomon Hykes, and Sebastien Pahl in Paris, and incorporated in the United States in 2010. In July 2013, Benjamin Golub (formerly of Plaxo and Gluster) became chief executive.

On September 19, 2013, dotCloud and Red Hat announced an alliance to integrate Docker with OpenShift, Red Hat's Platform-as-a-Service (PaaS) offering. On October 29, 2013, dotCloud was renamed Docker.

On July 23, 2014, Docker acquired two-person startup Orchard.

On August 4, 2014, the dotCloud technology and brand was sold to cloudControl. Four person company Koality was acquired on October 7, 2014.

On October 15, 2014, Microsoft announced a partnership, and its services were announced for the Amazon Elastic Compute Cloud (EC2) on November 13, 2014.

Docker was estimated to be valued at over $1 billion, making it what is called a "unicorn company", after a $95 million fundraising round in April 2015.

In April 2016, it was revealed that the CIA's investment arm In-Q-Tel was a large investor in Docker.

In May 2019, Rob Bearden became CEO.

In November 2019, Mirantis, a cloud computing company, acquired Docker's enterprise business. and Scott Johnston became CEO.

On August 31, 2021, Docker released Docker Business subscription for large companies, and changed the licensing terms for Docker Desktop users.

=== Venture rounds ===
The Docker company has received multiple rounds of funding to support its growth and development. In February 2011, the company secured $800,000 in seed capital from angel investors including Chris Sacca, Jerry Yang, and Ron Conway. A month later, in March 2011, Docker raised $10 million in a Series A funding round led by Benchmark Capital and Trinity Ventures. The company continued to attract significant investment, raising $15 million in a Series B round led by Greylock Partners in January 2014, followed by $40 million in a Series C round led by Sequoia Capital in September 2014. In April 2015, Docker raised $95 million in a Series D round led by Insight Venture Partners. The company secured another $18 million in November 2015 as part of the same funding round.

In November 2019, after restructuring, Docker announced it had secured $35 million in a Series A recapitalisation round. Most recently, in March 2021, Docker raised $23 million in a Series B round led by Tribe Capital, and in March 2022, the company secured $105 million in a Series C round led by Bain Capital.

== Acquisitions ==
- July 23, 2014 – Orchard
- February 26, 2015 – SocketPlane
- January 21, 2016 – Unikernel Systems
- April 11, 2022 – Infosiftr
- May 10, 2022 – Nestybox
- May 24, 2022 – Tilt
- June 21, 2022 – Atomist
- June 27, 2023 – Mutagen
- December 11, 2023 – AtomicJar
- September 5, 2025 – MCP Defender
