= Cluster manager =

Backend in computing

Within cluster and parallel computing, a cluster manager is usually backend graphical user interface (GUI) or command-line interface (CLI) software that runs on a set of cluster nodes that it manages (in some cases it runs on a different server or cluster of management servers). The cluster manager works together with a cluster management agent. These agents run on each node of the cluster to manage and configure services, a set of services, or to manage and configure the complete cluster server itself (see supercomputing.) In some cases the cluster manager is mostly used to dispatch work for the cluster (or cloud) to perform. In this last case a subset of the cluster manager can be a remote desktop application that is used not for configuration but just to send work and get back work results from a cluster. In other cases the cluster is more related to availability and load balancing than to computational or specific service clusters.

== See also ==
- List of cluster management software
- Grid network
