= Open Virtualization Alliance =

Organization

- Purpose: Development of free and open-source software
- Parent organization: Linux Foundation

The Open Virtualization Alliance (OVA) was a Linux Foundation Collaborative Project committed to foster the adoption of free and open-source software virtualization solutions including KVM, but also software to manage such, e.g. oVirt. The consortium promoted examples of customer successes, encouraged interoperability and accelerated the expansion of the ecosystem of third party solutions around KVM.

The OVA provided education, best practices and technical advice to help businesses understand and evaluate their virtualization options. The consortium complemented the existing open source communities managing the development of the KVM hypervisor and associated management capabilities, which are rapidly driving technology innovations for customers virtualizing both Linux and Windows® applications. The OVA was not a formal standards body and did not influence upstream development, but encouraged interoperability and the development of common interfaces and application programming interfaces (APIs) to ease the adoption of KVM for users.

On 21 October 2013, it was announced that the Open Virtualization Alliance will become a Linux Foundation Collaborative Project.

Having achieved its original purpose, on 1 December 2016, the OVA was officially dissolved.

== Software promoted by OVA ==
- Kernel-based Virtual Machine (KVM) – software that turns the Linux kernel into a hypervisor
- libvirt – API and its implementation to manage KVM and other virtualization solutions
- OVirt – web application for managing KVM
- libguestfs – API and its implementation for modifying virtual disk images

== Membership ==
Initially formed by Red Hat and IBM, the Alliance had over 200 members involved with enterprise virtualization. Participation was open and the OVA encouraged new participants to become members. Membership was tiered, with governing memberships requiring higher dues than general memberships. One of the criteria for joining the Alliance was to produce or use a product or service that is based on KVM.
