= Libvirt =

Management tool

libvirt
- Developer: Red Hat
- Initial release: December 19, 2005; 20 years ago
- Stable release: 12.2.0 / 1 April 2026; 31 days ago
- Written in: C
- Operating system: Linux, FreeBSD, Windows, macOS
- Type: Library
- License: GNU Lesser General Public License
- Website: libvirt.org
- Repository: gitlab.com/libvirt/libvirt

libvirt is an open-source API, daemon and management tool for managing platform virtualization. It can be used to manage KVM, Xen, VMware ESXi, QEMU and other virtualization technologies. These APIs are widely used in the orchestration layer of hypervisors in the development of a cloud-based solution.

== Internals ==
libvirt supports several Hypervisors and is supported by several management solutions

libvirt is a C library with bindings in other languages, notably in Python, Perl, OCaml, Ruby, Java, JavaScript (via Node.js) and PHP. libvirt for these programming languages is composed of wrappers around another class/package called libvirtmod. libvirtmod's implementation is closely associated with its counterpart in C/C++ in syntax and functionality.

=== Supported Hypervisors ===
- LXC – lightweight Linux container system
- OpenVZ – lightweight Linux container system
- Kernel-based Virtual Machine/QEMU (KVM) – open-source hypervisor for Linux and SmartOS
- Xen – bare-metal hypervisor
- User-mode Linux (UML) – paravirtualized kernel
- VirtualBox – hypervisor by Oracle (formerly by Sun) for Windows, Linux, macOS, and Solaris
- VMware ESXi and GSX – hypervisors for Intel hardware
- VMware Workstation and Player – hypervisors for Windows and Linux
- Hyper-V – hypervisor for Windows by Microsoft
- PowerVM – hypervisor by IBM for AIX, Linux and IBM i
- Bhyve – hypervisor for FreeBSD 10+ (support added with libvirt 1.2.2)

=== User Interfaces ===
Various virtualization programs and platforms use libvirt. Virtual Machine Manager, GNOME Boxes and others provide graphical interfaces. The most popular command line interface is virsh, and higher level tools such as oVirt.

== Corporate ==
Development of libvirt is backed by Red Hat, with significant contributions by other organisations and individuals. libvirt is available on most Linux distributions; remote servers are also accessible from Apple Mac OS X and Microsoft Windows clients.

== See also ==
- SPICE
- libguestfs
- Linux range of use § Virtualizing

== Books ==
- Warnke, Robert; Ritzau, Thomas. qemu-kvm & libvirt (in German). Norderstedt, Germany: Books on Demand. ISBN 978-3-8370-0876-0.
