= UML virtual machine =

A UML virtual machine may mean:

- a virtual machine that runs UML models
- a User Mode Linux virtual machine
