= Virt-manager =

Virtualisation software

Virtual Machine Manager

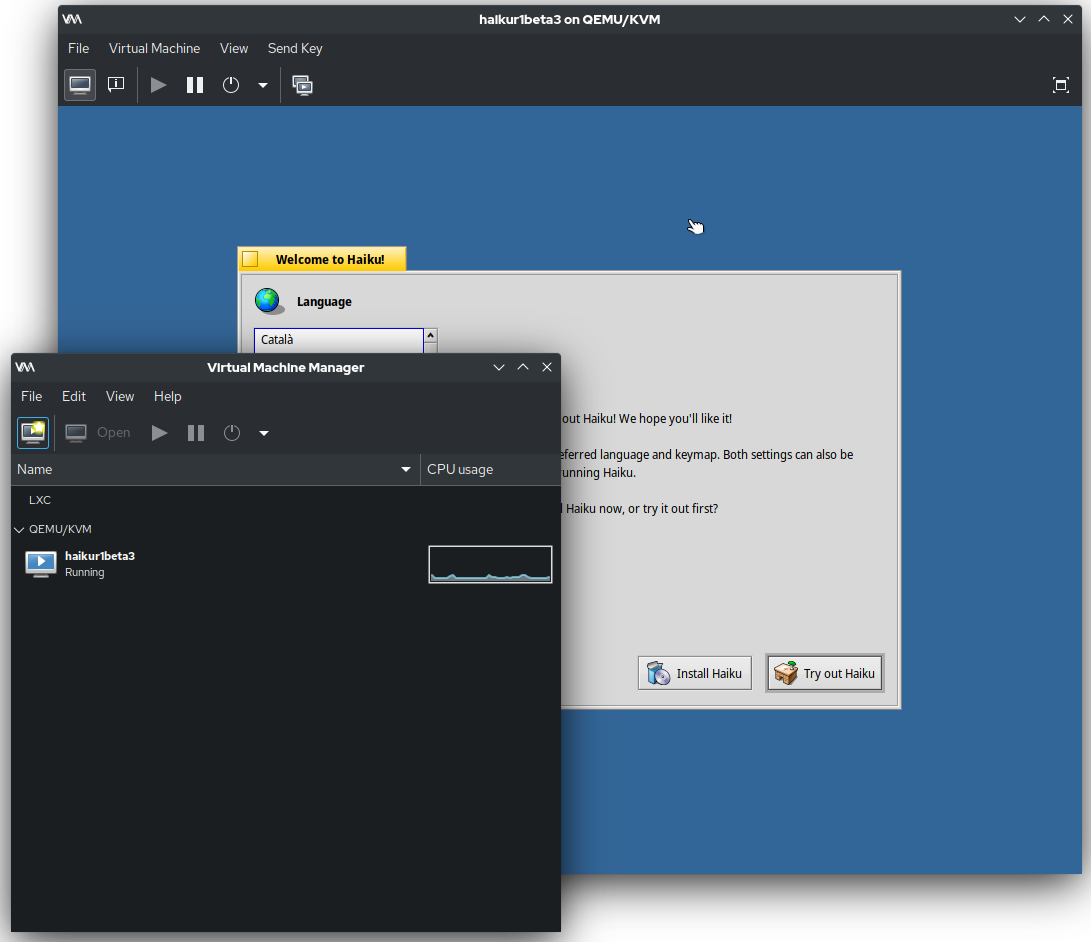
- Virtual Machine Manager running Haiku (installation phase)
- Developer: Red Hat
- Stable release: 5.1.0 / August 26, 2025; 12 months ago
- Written in: Python
- Operating system: Linux
- Type: Virtual machine
- License: GPL v2+
- Website: virt-manager.org
- Repository: github.com/virt-manager/virt-manager

Virtual Machine Manager (virt-manager) is based on libvirt and supports several Hypervisors

virt-manager is a desktop virtual machine monitor primarily developed by Red Hat.

== Features ==
Virt-manager allows users to:

- create, edit, start and stop VMs
- view and control each VM's console
- see performance and utilization statistics for each VM
- view all running VMs and hosts, and their live performance or resource utilization statistics.
- use KVM, Xen or QEMU virtual machines, running either locally or remotely.
- use LXC containers

Support for FreeBSD's bhyve hypervisor has been included since 2014, though it remains disabled by default.

== Distributions including Virtual Machine Manager ==
Virtual Machine Manager comes as the virt-manager package in:

- Arch Linux
- Alpine Linux
- CentOS
- Debian (since lenny)
- Fedora (since version 6)
- FreeBSD (via Ports collection)
- Frugalware
- Gentoo
- Mandriva Linux (since release 2007.1)
- MXLinux
- NetBSD (via pkgsrc)
- NixOS
- OpenBSD (via Ports collection)
- openSUSE (since release 10.3)
- Red Hat Enterprise Linux (versions 5 through 7 only)
- Scientific Linux
- Trisquel
- TrueOS
- Ubuntu (version 8.04 and above)
- Void Linux

== See also ==
- libvirt, the API used by Virtual Machine Manager to create and manage virtual machines
