= Glauber Costa =

Canadian software engineer (born 1982)

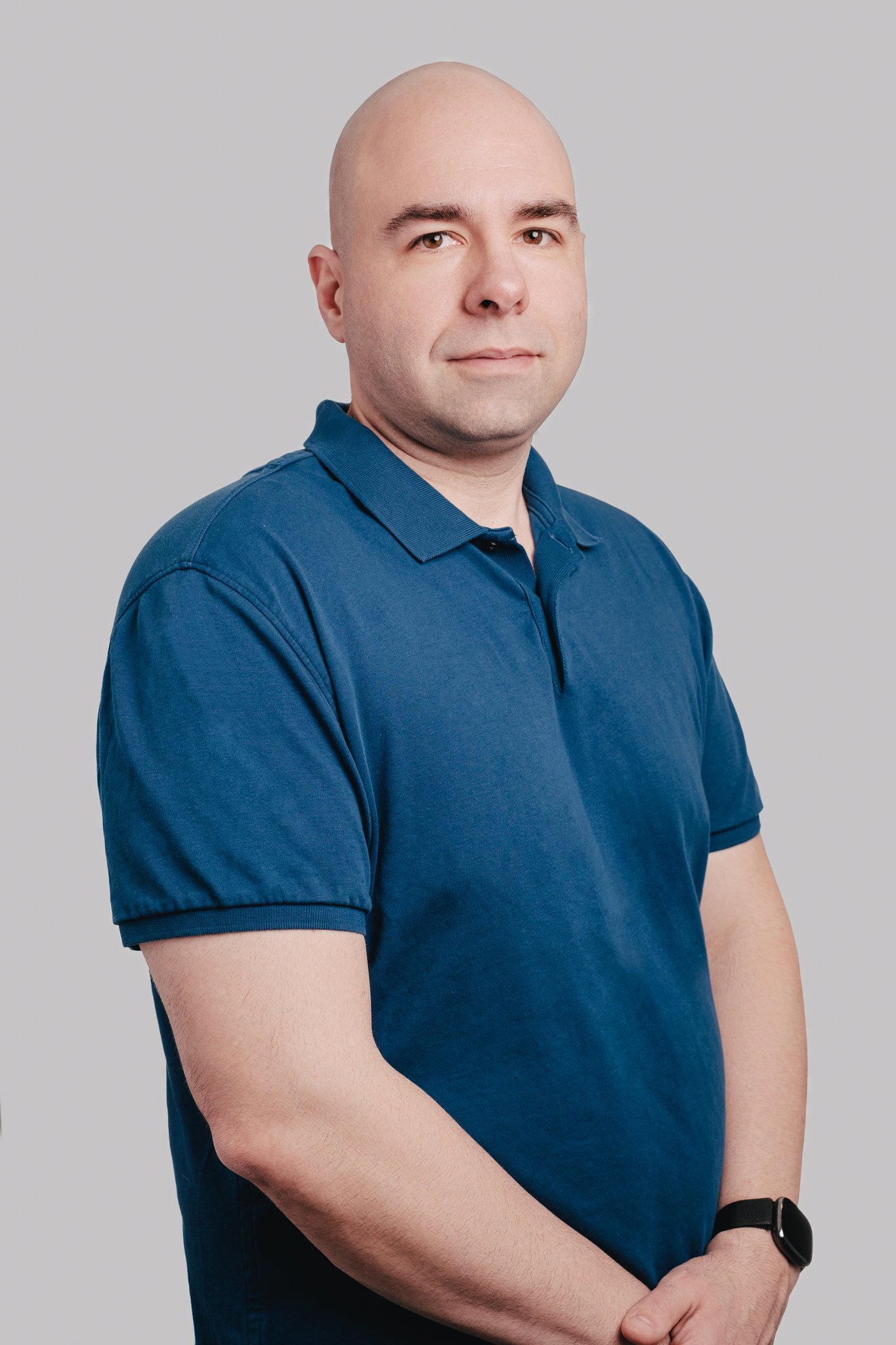
- Born: Glauber de Oliveira Costa; 1982 (age 43–44)
- Occupations: Head of Agentic Data Services, Co-founder (Turso), software engineer
- Employer: Supabase
- Known for: Kernel-based Virtual Machine, ScyllaDB

Glauber Costa is a Canadian software engineer recognized for his contributions to high-performance systems software, including Linux kernel, Kernel-based Virtual Machine (KVM), the OSv unikernel, ScyllaDB, and Rust open source projects. Linus Torvalds recognized him as one of the top contributors to the Linux x86 subsystem. Costa is the co-founder of Turso, reimplementation of the SQLite database in Rust. He was CEO for over 5 years before Turso was acquired by Supabase. Costa is currently Head of Agentic Data Services at Supabase.

== Career ==
=== Linux kernel and virtualization ===
Costa began his career working on the Linux kernel, with a focus on virtualization and resource isolation. In 2008 he was recognized in the Linux Foundation report "Who Writes Linux" as one of the most active contributors to the Linux Kernel. In that same year, Linus Torvalds listed him among the top five committers to the x86 subsystem, alongside Ingo Molnár and Thomas Gleixner. He was also recognized as the third most active 2.6.26 developers (by changeset).

Costa has done significant work in the development of timekeeping primitives for the KVM hypervisor and developed parts of the memory cgroups subsystem, including early kernel memory accounting features.

In 2011, he implemented the first per-cgroup TCP buffer limits, extending the kernel's memory controller to account for kernel memory such as TCP socket buffers. He later designed mechanisms to extend memory control groups to additional parts of kernel memory, work that underpinned container isolation in Linux. Costa also proposed and prototyped cgroup-aware out-of-memory (OOM) handling, allowing policies such as killing all tasks within a memory-constrained cgroup rather than individual processes.

Costa was a core contributor to Kernel-based Virtual Machine (KVM) and helped merge the KVM codebase into the upstream QEMU emulator.

=== OSv ===
In 2013, Costa joined Cloudius Systems, where he co-developed OSv, an open source unikernel targeting cloud workloads. The OSv design is described in the USENIX ATC 2014 paper "OSv: Optimizing the Operating System for Virtual Machines", a paper that Costa co-authored.

=== ScyllaDB ===
Costa was part of the team that created ScyllaDB in 2014. He joined as a founding engineer and later advanced to VP of Field Engineering. He contributed to the engine's open source Seastar framework, shard-per-core architecture, memory and I/O optimizations.

=== Glommio ===
In 2020, while working at Datadog, Costa developed the Glommio open-source asynchronous Rust programming library. It uses a thread-per-core model and Linux's io_uring to support building highly parallel, low-latency applications on Linux. The project was released publicly by Datadog.

=== Turso ===
In 2021, Costa co-founded Turso (initially ChiselStrike) along with Pekka Enberg. The company builds a distributed database that is a reimplementation of SQLite in Rust. Costa serves as the company's CEO.

== Publications ==
Costa has authored technical publications and open-source contributions throughout his career. Notably, he co-authored the research paper "OSv – Optimizing the Operating System for Virtual Machines" presented at USENIX ATC 2014, which detailed the unikernel approach taken by OSv. Costa has also written technical articles on systems programming (for instance, on how io_uring and eBPF can revolutionize Linux programming). Additionally, he has spoken at conferences such as USENIX, LinuxCon, KVM Forum, Xen Project Summit, and P99 CONF.

== Patents ==
Costa has been granted patents for systems software and virtualization technologies:

- Guaranteeing deterministic bounded tunable downtime for live migration of virtual machines over reliable channels (US 8880773 B2)
- Comparing source code using code statement structures (US 8533668 B2)
- Keeping time in multi-processor virtualization environments (US 8359488 B2)
- Building packages of functionally different programs from source code of a single program (US 9081646 B2)
- Method and system for concise expression of optional code snippets in interpreted languages US 8549485 B2

== See also ==
- Linux kernel
- Kernel-based Virtual Machine (KVM)
- ScyllaDB
- OSv
