= Ova (disambiguation) =

Ova is the plural form of ovum, the female sex cell or gamete.

Ova or OVA may also refer to:

== Places ==
- Ova, Kaş, a village in the Antalya Province, Turkey
- Ova, Kentucky, an unincorporated community
- Ovà, Piedmontese name for Ovada, a comune in Piedmont, Italy

== Organizations ==
- Office for Veterans' Affairs, part of the UK Government
- Open Virtualization Alliance, consortium promoting the use of free and open-source software

== Science and technology ==
- Ovalbumin (OVA), a protein found in egg whites
- .ova, filename extension in Open Virtualization Format
- Original video animation, anime films released directly to video

== Other uses ==
- -ova, a feminine surname suffix in Eastern Slavic naming customs
