= GNOME Boxes =

Virtualization software

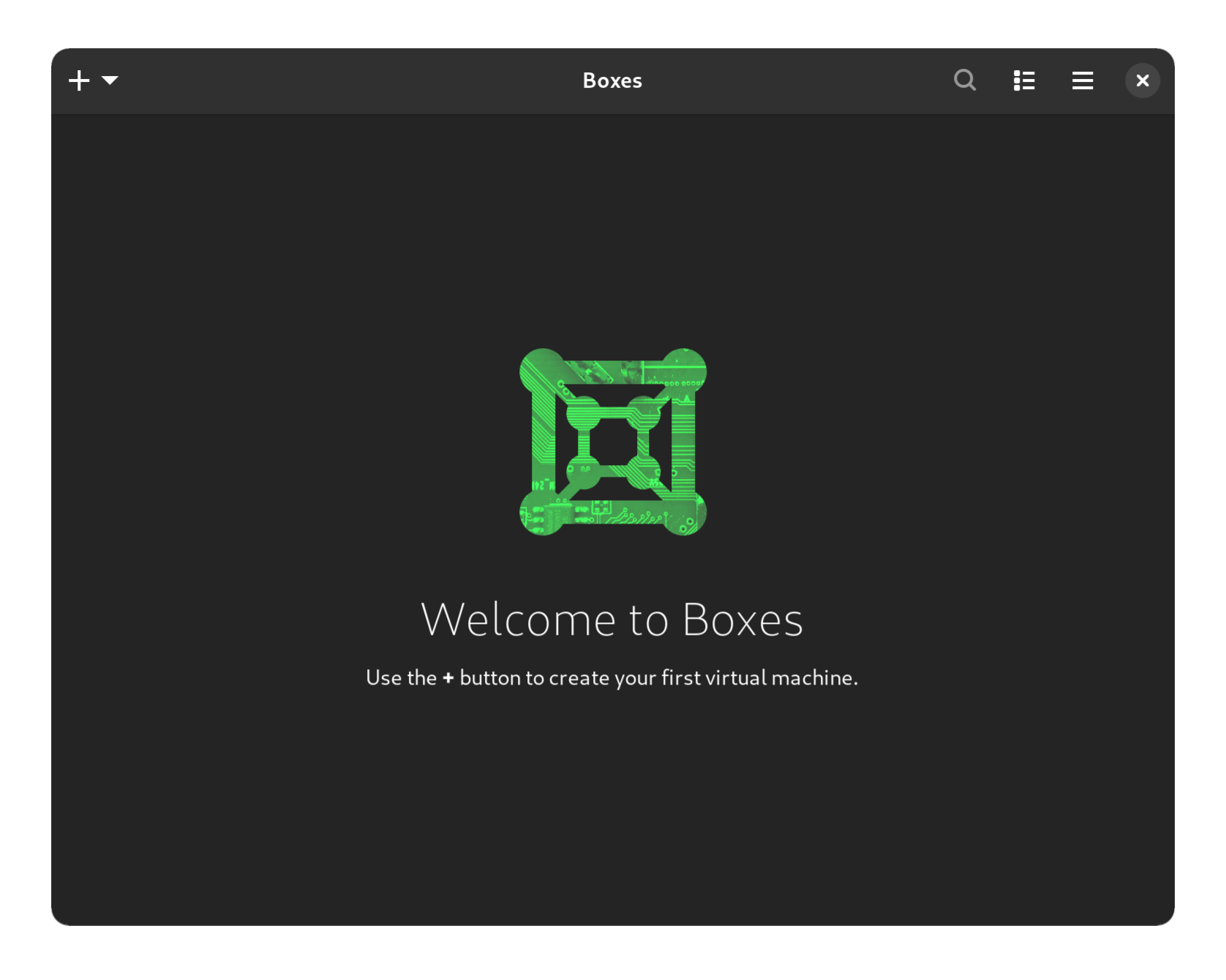
- The box creation "Source Selection" screen for Boxes 3.32
- Developer: The GNOME Project
- Stable release: 47.0 / 17 September 2024; 23 months ago
- Preview release: 41.alpha / 9 July 2021; 5 years ago
- Written in: C, Vala
- Platform: GNOME
- License: GNU LGPL-2.1+
- Website: apps.gnome.org/Boxes/
- Repository: gitlab.gnome.org/GNOME/gnome-boxes.git

GNOME Boxes is an application of the GNOME Desktop Environment, used to access virtual systems. Boxes uses the QEMU, KVM, and libvirt virtualization technologies.

== History and functionality ==
GNOME Boxes was initially introduced as beta software in GNOME 3.3 (development branch for 3.4) as of Dec 2011, and as a preview release in GNOME 3.4. Its primary functions were as a virtual machine manager, remote desktop client (over VNC), and remote filesystem browser, utilizing the libvirt, libvirt-glib, and libosinfo technologies. This enabled the viewing of remote systems and virtual machines on other computers in addition to locally created virtual machines. Boxes possesses the ability to easily create local virtual machines from a standard disk image file, such as an ISO image while requiring minimum user input. As of version 40, the remote connection functionality has been moved to the separate application, GNOME Connections.

GNOME Boxes requires the CPU to support some form of hardware-assisted virtualization (AMD-V or Intel VT-x, for example).

== People ==
Boxes was originally developed by Marc-André Lureau, Zeeshan Ali, Alexander Larsson and Christophe Fergeau and is currently being maintained and developed by Felipe Borges.

== See also ==
- VirtualBox
- Red Hat Virtual Machine Manager (virt-manager)
- VMware Workstation
- List of GNOME applications
