= Moshe Bar (investor) =

Israeli writer and businessman (born 1971)

- משה בר
- Born: June 1971 (age 55); Jerusalem, Israel
- Occupations: Author, Investor, Entrepreneur
- Known for: CEO of Codenotary Inc., Founder of Qumranet and XenSource

Moshe Bar (Hebrew: משה בר; born in Jerusalem in June 1971) is an Israeli and American author, investor and entrepreneur.

== Biography ==
He is currently CEO of Codenotary Inc., a provider of solutions to record business data immutably, using and initiator of the open source project immudb.io. He was previously a general partner of Texas Atlantic Capital LP, a venture capital company. Prior to that, he was a co-founder of Qumranet. Qumranet was sold to Red Hat in 2008 for US$107 million.

He previously co-founded the company behind the Xen software, XenSource, which was sold to Citrix for US$500 million in 2007. Before that he founded Qlusters Inc, and was the founder, main developer and project manager of openMosix. Furthermore, he frequently acts as an angel investor in high-tech start-up companies such as Hyper9, Neebula, Delivery Hero SE, and Qlayer, which was sold to Sun Microsystems in January 2009.

The author of several books on Linux, file systems and open source development, he was also a senior editor at Byte Magazine for over eight years. He also taught at Tel Aviv University.
