= Q (emulator) =

- Developer(s): Mike Kronenberg, others
- Stable release: 0.9.0a89
- Preview release: 0.9.1d118 / February 16, 2008; 17 years ago
- Operating system: Mac OS X
- Type: Emulator
- License: GNU General Public License
- Website: https://web.archive.org/web/20160303205232/http://www.kju-app.org/ (The www.kju-app.org page isn’t working)

Q is a free emulator software that runs on Mac OS X, including OS X on PowerPC. Q is Mike Kronenberg's port of the open source and generic processor emulator QEMU. Q uses Cocoa and other Apple technologies, such as Core Image and Core Audio, to achieve its emulation. Q can be used to run Windows, or any other operating system based on the x86 architecture, on the Macintosh.

Q is available as a Universal Binary and, as such, can run on Intel or PowerPC based Macintosh systems. However, some target guest architectures are unsupported on Lion (due to the removal of Rosetta) such as SPARC, MIPS, ARM and x86_64 since the softmmus are PowerPC only binaries.

Unlike QEMU, which is a command-line application, Q has a native graphical interface for managing and configuring virtual machines.

As of June 2022, the project was "on hold".

== See also ==
- qcow
- Comparison of platform virtualization software
- SPIM
- Emulator
- QEMU
