= Qumranet =

Former enterprise software company

- Industry: Software
- Founded: 2005; 21 years ago
- Founder: Benny Schnaider
- Parent: Red Hat

Qumranet, Inc. was an enterprise software company offering a desktop virtualization platform based on hosted desktops in Kernel-based Virtual Machines (KVM) on servers, linked with their SPICE protocol. The company was also the creator, maintainer and global sponsor of the KVM open source hypervisor.

== History ==
The company was founded in 2005 by CEO Benny Schnaider, with Rami Tamir as president, Moshe Bar as CTO, and chairman Giora Yaron. Qumranet had raised $20 million in two financing rounds from its founders, Norwest Venture Partners, Cisco Systems, and Sequoia Capital, in addition to investment by the founding partners.

The company's first product, named "Solid ICE", hosted Windows and Linux desktops on central servers located in a data center.

The Ra'anana-based company developed a virtualization technology for IT data centers.

The company introduced KVM into the Linux kernel, and their Solid ICE desktop virtualization platform received attention.

Avi Kivity was the lead developer and maintainer of the Kernel-based Virtual Machine project from mid-2006, that has been part of the Linux kernel since the 2.6.20 release in February 2007.

Qumranet was on the Gartner Group's 2008 list of "Cool Vendors," an award given to small companies with advanced technology.

On September 4, 2008, Qumranet was acquired by Red Hat, Inc. for $107 million.

== Key executives ==
- Benny Schnaider, co-founder, chief executive officer and director
- Rami Tamir, Co-Founder, president and director
- Moshe Bar Ph.D., co-founder and chief technology officer
- Giora Yaron Ph.D, co-founder and chairman of the board
- Shmil Levy, board member, Sequoia Capital
- Vab Goel, board member, Norwest Venture Partners
