= Firecracker (software) =

Serverless computing infrastructure

- Developer: Amazon Web Services
- Initial release: December 2018; 7 years ago
- Repository: github.com/firecracker-microvm/firecracker
- Written in: Rust, Python
- Type: Virtualization
- License: Apache 2.0
- Website: firecracker-microvm.github.io

Firecracker is virtualization software developed by Amazon Web Services for its AWS Lambda serverless computing platform. It makes use of KVM.
