= MetaMatrix =

Defunct American technology company

MetaMatrix, Inc.
- Type: Private
- Industry: Software
- Founded: 1998; 28 years ago
- Headquarters: United States
- Key people: Philippe Chambadal, Co-Founder & CEO; Mike Lang, Co-Founder & EVP; Rob Cardwell, CTO; Brad Wright, SVP Operations; Craig Muzilla, SVP Marketing; Steve Jacobs, SVP Development
- Products: MetaMatrix Enterprise, MetaMatrix Dimension, MetaMatrix Query
- Number of employees: 97 (2006)
- Website: www.metamatrix.com

MetaMatrix was a U.S.-based technology company that created an enterprise information integration (EII) software product to deliver data services for service-oriented architectures. Founded in 1998 as Quadrian, MetaMatrix has development offices in St. Louis and Boston, and business offices in NY, Baltimore, Washington, DC, Boston, and London.

In June 2007, MetaMatrix was acquired by Red Hat for integration within service-oriented architecture environments served by Red Hat's JBoss middleware products.

== Products ==
MetaMatrix offered products providing data services for service-oriented architectures (SOAs).

- MetaMatrix Enterprise
- MetaMatrix Dimension
- MetaMatrix Query
