= OSv =

- Developer: Cloudius Systems
- Written in: C++
- Working state: Stable
- Source model: Open source
- Initial release: September 16, 2013; 12 years ago
- Marketing target: Cloud computing
- Available in: Multilingual
- Supported platforms: x86-64 using the KVM, Xen, VMware, and VirtualBox hypervisors. (arm64 on KVM is under development)
- Kernel type: Unikernel
- Userland: POSIX, Java, Ruby
- Default user interface: CLI, web
- License: BSD license
- Official website: osv.io

OSv (stylized OS^{v}) is a cloud computing focused computer operating system released on September 16, 2013. It is a special-purpose operating system built to run as a guest on top of a virtual machine, thus it does not include drivers for bare-metal hardware.

It is a unikernel, designed to run a single Linux executable or an application written in one of the supported runtime environments (such as Java). For this reason, it does not support a notion of users (it's not a multiuser system) or processes - everything runs in a single address space, there is no difference between users address space and kernel address space. Using a single address space removes some of the time-consuming operations associated with context switching.

It uses large amounts of code from the FreeBSD operating system, in particular the network stack and the ZFS file system. OSv can be managed using a REST Management API and an optional command-line interface written in Lua.

== See also ==
- Avi Kivity
- Glauber Costa
