= Red Hat Virtualization =

Virtualization software

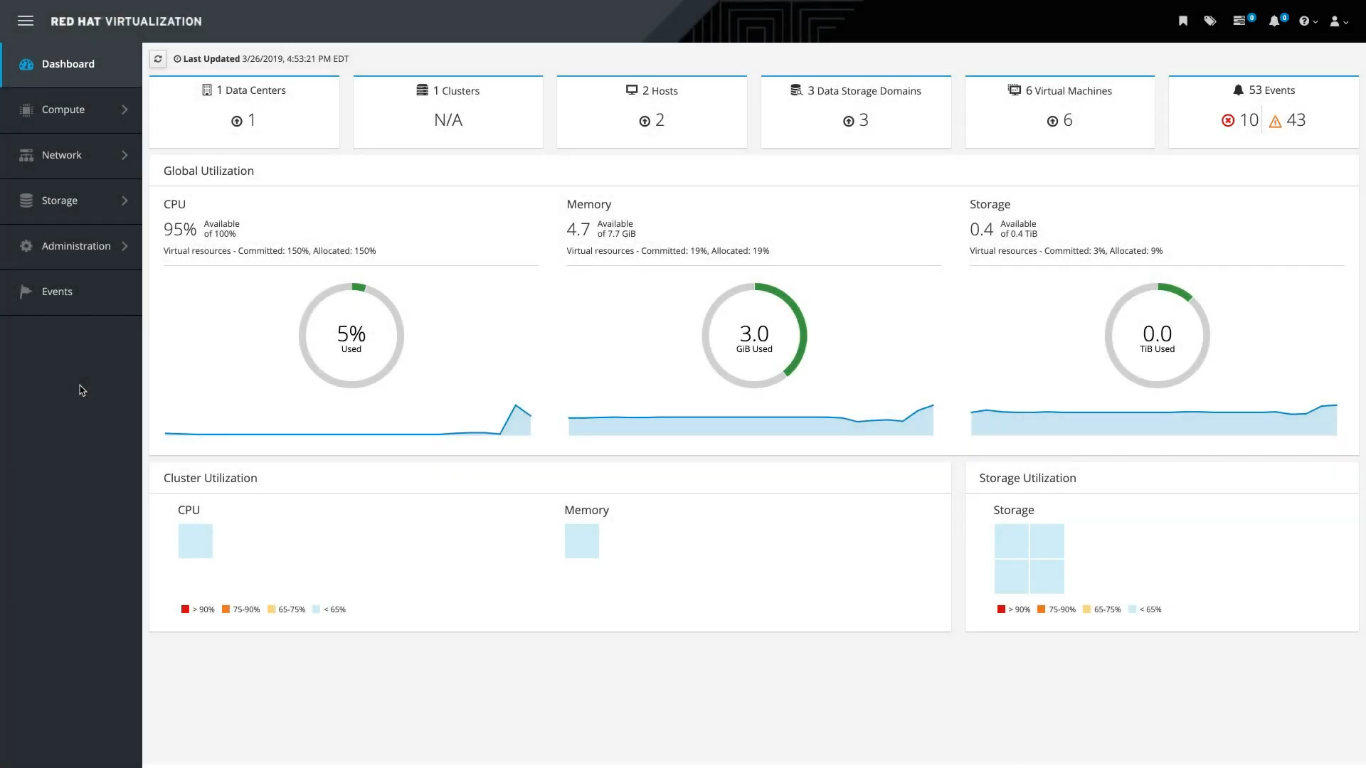
- Developer: Red Hat, Inc.
- Initial release: November 3, 2009; 16 years ago
- Stable release: 4.4 / August 4, 2020; 5 years ago
- Written in: Java, JSP
- Platform: x64-compatible
- Successor: OpenShift
- Type: Hypervisor
- Website: www.redhat.com/en/technologies/virtualization/enterprise-virtualization

Red Hat Virtualization (RHV), formerly known as Red Hat Enterprise Virtualization, is an x86 virtualization product developed by Red Hat, and is based on the KVM hypervisor. Red Hat Virtualization uses the SPICE protocol and VDSM (Virtual Desktop Server Manager) with a RHEL-based centralized management server. The platform can access user and group information from either an Active Directory or FreeIPA domain which enables it to allocate resources effectively based on permissions. Built for use in enterprise datacenters, RHV can support up to 400 hosts in a single cluster and no upper limit on the total number of hosts it can support. Development of RHV has ceased and as of August 2020 the product is now only receiving maintenance updates, with extended life phase updates provided until 2026. The successor to RHV is Red Hat's OpenShift container platform.
