= Avi Kivity =

Software developer and entrepreneur (born 1970)

- Born: 1970 (age 55–56)
- Education: Technion - Israel Institute of Technology
- Occupations: Co-founder, CTO, Software engineer
- Employer: ScyllaDB
- Known for: Kernel-based Virtual Machine, ScyllaDB

Avi Kivity (Hebrew: אבי קויתי) is a software engineer who created the Kernel-based Virtual Machine (KVM) hypervisor underlying many production clouds. Following his work on KVM, Kivity developed the Seastar framework and the ScyllaDB database. He co-founded the company ScyllaDB with Dor Laor; Kivity is CTO and an active project contributor.

== Career ==
Kivity began the development of KVM at Qumranet in 2006. After Red Hat acquired Qumranet in 2008, Kivity joined Red Hat and continued as the lead developer and maintainer of KVM.

After leaving Red Hat in 2012, Kivity co-founded a company called Cloudius Systems with Dor Laor. Cloudius developed the OSv operating system for the cloud. While at Cloudius, Kivity created the Seastar framework, an open-source (Apache 2.0 licensed) C++ framework for I/O intensive asynchronous computing. Seastar later became the foundation for high performance distributed systems such as ScyllaDB, Redpanda, and Ceph.

In mid-2014, Cloudius Systems was renamed to ScyllaDB, after its main product which is used for high-throughput database workloads that require low latencies. (Forbes) Kivity serves as the company's chief technology officer and contributes to the source code development of ScyllaDB as well as Seastar.

== Patents ==
Kivity has been granted patents for technologies implemented in KVM and ScyllaDB

- Asynchronous input/output (I/O) using alternate stack switching in kernel space (8850443)
- Delivery of events from a virtual machine to host CPU using memory monitoring instructions (9256455)
- Delivery of events from a virtual machine to a thread executable by multiple host CPUs using memory monitoring instructions (9489228)
- CPU using memory monitoring instructions (9256455)]
- Delivery of events from a virtual machine to a thread executable by multiple host CPUs using memory monitoring instructions (9489228)
- Detection of guest disk cache (9354916)
- Event signaling in virtualized systems (9830286)
- Heat-based load balancing (11157561)
- Injecting interrupts in virtualized computer systems (9235538)
- Interprocess communication (9075795)
- Managing device access using an address hint (9575787)
- Mechanism for automatic adjustment of virtual machine storage (8244956)
- Mechanism for memory state restoration of virtual machine (VM)-controlled peripherals at a destination host machine during migration of the VM (8356120)
- Mechanism for out-of-synch virtual machine memory management optimization (8560758)
- Memory change tracking during migration of virtual machine (VM) with VM-controlled assigned peripherals (9104459)
- Memory state transfer of virtual machine-controlled peripherals during migrations of the virtual machine (8924965)
- MSI events using dynamic memory monitoring (10078603)
- On-demand hypervisor memory mapping (9342450)
- Optimistic interrupt affinity for devices (9003094)
- Optimization of operating system and virtual machine monitor memory management (10761957)
- Pessimistic interrupt affinity for devices (9201823)
- Policy enforcement by hypervisor paravirtualized ring copying (9904564)
- Virtual machine wakeup using a memory monitoring instruction (9489223)

== See also ==
- Kernel-based Virtual Machine (KVM)
- ScyllaDB
