= Kimchi (software) =

Web management tool to manage KVM infrastructure, developed by IBM

- Original author(s): IBM
- Developer(s): Kimchi Project
- Stable release: 3.0 / 7 January 2020; 5 years ago
- Written in: Python
- Operating system: management host:Linux, guest OS: Linux, Microsoft Windows
- Platform: Apache HTTP Server
- Available in: English, Chinese, Português
- Type: KVM Virtualization Management
- Licence: LGPL
- Website: kimchi-project.github.io/kimchi/

Kimchi is a web management tool to manage Kernel-based Virtual Machine (KVM) infrastructure. Developed with HTML5, Kimchi is developed to intuitively manage KVM guests, create storage pools, manage network interfaces (bridges, VLANs, NAT), and perform other related tasks. The name is an extended acronym for KVM infrastructure management. It is an Apache-licensed project hosted on GitHub, and incubated by oVirt.org.
