= Memory overcommitment =

Memory overcommitment is a concept in computing that covers the assignment of more memory to virtual computing devices (or processes) than the physical machine they are hosted, or running on, actually has. This is possible because virtual machines (or processes) do not necessarily use as much memory at any one point as they are assigned, creating a buffer. If four virtual machines each have 1 GB of memory on a physical machine with 4 GB of memory, but those virtual machines are only using 500 MB, it is possible to create additional virtual machines that take advantage of the 500 MB each existing machine is leaving free. Memory swapping is then used to handle spikes in memory usage. The disadvantage of this approach is that memory swap files are slower to read from than 'actual' memory, which can lead to performance drops. Another disadvantage is that, when running out of real memory, the system is relying on the applications to not use the additional memory despite it being allocated to them. Should a program do so anyway, it or another has to be killed in order to free up memory to prevent the system from freezing. The OOM Killer is what performs this task.

While memory overcommitment is usually talked about in the context of virtualization, it is actually a generalised concept; Windows NT contained overcommitment features, as do most modern generalised operating systems, including the Linux kernel.

== See also ==
- Memory ballooning
