= Simple Protocol for Independent Computing Environments =

Remote computer desktop sharing protocol

SPICE
- Original author(s): Qumranet
- Developer(s): Red Hat
- Stable release: spice-protocol: 0.14.4 / February 10, 2022; 3 years ago; spice: 0.15.1 / October 12, 2022; 2 years ago; spice-gtk: 0.41 / July 4, 2022; 2 years ago
- Written in: C, C++
- Operating system: Linux, Windows, Android (Client)
- Type: Server, client
- License: GPL, LGPL and BSD
- Website: spice-space.org

In computing, SPICE (the Simple Protocol for Independent Computing Environments) is a remote-display system built for virtual environments which allows users to view a computing "desktop" environment – not only on its computer-server machine, but also from anywhere on the Internet – using a wide variety of machine architectures.

Qumranet originally developed SPICE using a closed-source codebase in 2007. Red Hat, Inc acquired Qumranet in 2008, and in December 2009 released the code under an open-source license and made the protocol an open standard.

== Security ==
A SPICE client connection to a remote desktop server consists of multiple data channels, each of which is run over a separate TCP or UNIX socket connection. A data channel can be designated to operate in either clear-text, or TLS modes, allowing the administrator to trade off the security level vs performance. The TLS mode provides strong encryption of all traffic transmitted on the data channel.

In addition to encryption, the SPICE protocol allows for a choice of authentication schemes. The original SPICE protocol defined a ticket based authentication scheme using a shared secret. The server would generate an RSA public/private keypair and send its public key to the client. The client would encrypt the ticket (password) with the public key and send the result back to the server, which would decrypt and verify the ticket. The current SPICE protocol also allows for use of the SASL authentication protocol, thus enabling support for a wide range of admin configurable authentication mechanisms, in particular Kerberos.

== Implementations ==
While only one server implementation exists, several programmers have developed new implementations of the SPICE client-side since the open-sourcing of SPICE.

spice-protocol
The spice-protocol module defines the SPICE wire protocol formats. This is made available under the BSD license, and is portable across the Linux and Windows platforms.
spice
The spice module provides the reference implementation for the server side of the SPICE protocol. The server is provided as a dynamic library which can be linked to any application wishing to expose a SPICE server. As of 2013, QEMU uses this to provide a SPICE interface for virtual machines. The spice codebase is available under the LGPL v2+ license.
A client part of the spice codebase named spicec was removed in December 2014.
spice-gtk
The spice-gtk module implements a SPICE client using the GObject type system and the GTK widget toolkit. This comprises a low-level library, spice-client-glib, which implements the client protocol code, and a high-level set of widgets which provide a graphical client capability using GTK. This is made available under the LGPLv2+ license, and is portable across the Linux, OS X and Windows platforms.
spice-html5
The spice-html5 module implements a SPICE client that uses JavaScript and is intended to run inside a web browser supporting HTML5. While it implements the SPICE protocol, it cannot talk directly to a regular SPICE server. It must connect to the server indirectly via WebSocket proxy. This is made available under a combination of the GPLv3+ and LGPLv3+ licenses.

== Applications ==
The SPICE protocol originated to provide improved remote desktop capabilities in a fork of the KVM codebase.

QEMU/KVM
The QEMU maintainers merged support for providing SPICE remote desktop capabilities for all QEMU virtual machines in March 2010. The QEMU binary links to the spice-server library to provide this capability and implements the QXL paravirtualized framebuffer device to enable the guest OS to take advantage of the performance benefits the SPICE protocol offers. The guest OS may also use a regular VGA card, albeit with degraded performance as compared to QXL.
Xspice
The X.Org Server driver for the QXL framebuffer device includes a wrapper script, which makes it possible to launch a Xorg server whose display is exported via the SPICE protocol. This enables use of SPICE in a remote desktop environment, without requiring QEMU/KVM virtualization.
virt-viewer
The virt-viewer program uses the spice-gtk client library to connect to virtual machines using SPICE, as an alternative to its previous support for VNC.
oVirt
SPICE is integrated into oVirt private cloud management software, allowing users to connect to virtual machines through SPICE.

== See also ==
- Red Hat Virtualization
- HP Remote Graphics Software
