= OpenBIOS =

Free software implementation of Open Firmware

- Original author: OpenBIOS Project
- Developer: OpenBIOS community
- Stable release: 1.1 / May 4, 2013; 12 years ago
- Platform: PowerPC, SPARC
- Type: Firmware
- License: GNU General Public License v2
- Website: www.openfirmware.info
- Repository: https://github.com/openbios/openbios

OpenBIOS is a project aiming to provide free and open source implementations of Open Firmware. It is also the name of such an implementation.

Most of the implementations provided by OpenBIOS rely on additional lower-level firmware for hardware initialization, such as coreboot or Das U-Boot.

== Provided implementations ==
=== Open Firmware ===
Open Firmware
- Developer: Firmworks
- Initial release: 2006
- Platform: x86, PowerPC, ARM
- License: BSD like
- Website: www.openfirmware.info/Open_Firmware
- Repository: https://github.com/openbios/openfirmware

Open Firmware implements the IEEE 1275-1994 standard. Open Firmware was released by the company Firmworks. The principal architect of Open Firmware, Mitch Bradley, is chairman of the Open Firmware Working Group and president and founder of Firmworks. The OLPC XO-1 laptop uses the Open Firmware implementation. It supports the x86, PowerPC, and ARM architectures, and is released under the terms of a BSD style license.

=== SmartFirmware ===
SmartFirmware
- Developers: CodeGen, Inc.
- Written in: ANSI C
- Platform: x86, PowerPC, SPARC, ARM, MIPS
- Website: www.codegen.com/SmartFirmware/
- Repository: https://github.com/openbios/smartfirmware

SmartFirmware includes a C to FCode compiler. It is made by CodeGen, Inc. It is written in ANSI C and supports the x86, PowerPC, SPARC, ARM, MIPS architectures.

=== OpenBOOT ===
OpenBOOT
- Original author: Sun Microsystems
- Platform: SPARC
- Website: www.openfirmware.info/OpenBOOT
- Repository: https://github.com/openbios/openboot

OpenBOOT was released by Sun Microsystems. It supports the sun4v architecture.

=== OpenBIOS ===
OpenBIOS is portable and licensed under the GPL. It is produced by the OpenBIOS project.

=== SLOF ===
SLOF
- Developer: IBM
- Stable release: 1.7.0-4 / December 1, 2008; 17 years ago
- Written in: C, Forth
- Platform: PowerPC
- License: Revised BSD license
- Website: web.archive.org/web/20080613161337/http://www.ibm.com/developerworks/power/pa-slof/
- Repository: https://github.com/aik/SLOF/

Slimline Open Firmware is produced by IBM, and is released under a BSD style license. It supports the PowerPC architecture.

== See also ==
- Coreboot
