= Red Hat =

American open source software company

Red Hat, LLC

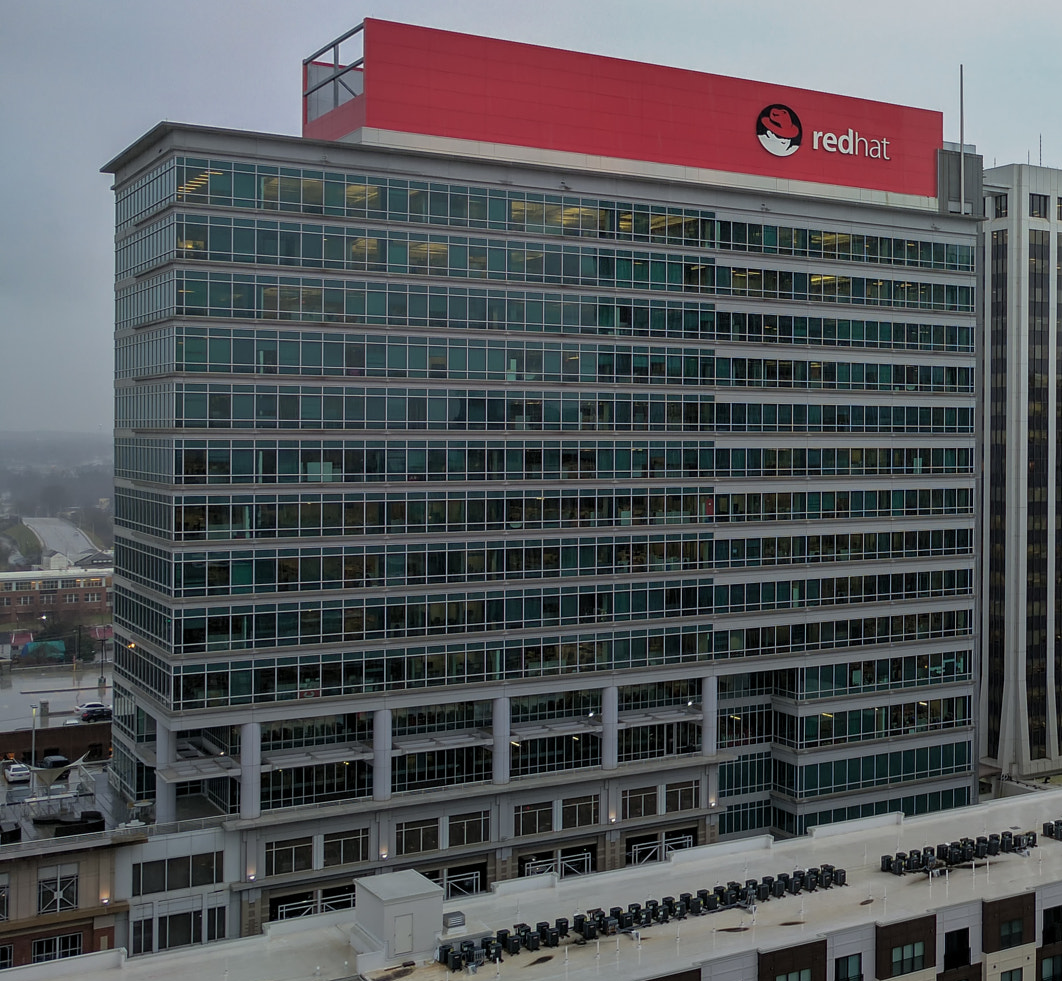
- Red Hat Tower, the company's headquarters in Raleigh, North Carolina in 2017
- Type: Subsidiary (Independent)
- Industry: Computer software
- Predecessor: Container Linux; Cygnus Solutions
- Founded: March 1993; 33 years ago
- Founder: Bob Young; Marc Ewing
- Headquarters: Raleigh, North Carolina, U.S.
- Area served: Worldwide
- Key people: Matt Hicks (President and CEO); Paul Cormier (Chairman)
- Products: List: Red Hat Enterprise Linux; Red Hat Directory Server; Satellite; Red Hat Enterprise Virtualization; Red Hat Storage Server; JBoss EAP; Red Hat Single Sign On; Ansible; CloudForms; OpenShift; Red Hat Hyperconverged Infrastructure for Virtualization; Red Hat Certificate System; Red Hat AMQ; Red Hat Insights
- Number of employees: 19,000
- Parent: IBM (2019–present)
- Subsidiaries: § Red Hat Czech; § Red Hat India
- Website: redhat.com

Red Hat, LLC (formerly Red Hat Software, Inc. and then Red Hat, Inc.) is an American software company that provides open source software products to enterprises and is an operating independent subsidiary of IBM. Founded in 1993, Red Hat has its corporate headquarters in Raleigh, North Carolina, with other offices worldwide.

Red Hat has become associated to a large extent with its enterprise operating system Red Hat Enterprise Linux (RHEL). Having grown significantly beyond just Linux, it also includes the OpenShift Container Platform, Ansible Automation Platform, and Red Hat AI.

Red Hat had acquired the open-source enterprise middleware vendor JBoss. Red Hat now offers OpenShift Virtualization, which replaces the long retired product Red Hat Virtualization (RHV), an enterprise virtualization product. Red Hat provides operating system platforms, middleware, applications, management products, solutions, support, training, and consulting services.

Red Hat creates, maintains, and contributes to many free software projects. It has acquired the codebases of several proprietary software products through corporate mergers and acquisitions, and has released such software under open source licenses. In 2025, Red Hat was the third-largest corporate contributor to the Linux kernel, accounting for 6.5% of the changes, behind Intel and Google.

On October 28, 2018, IBM announced its intent to acquire Red Hat for $34 billion. The acquisition closed on July 9, 2019, and it now operates as an independent subsidiary. On January 12, 2026, Red Hat converted from a corporation to a limited liability company.

== History ==
In 1993, Bob Young incorporated the ACC Corporation, a catalog business that sold Linux and Unix software accessories. In 1994, Marc Ewing created his own Linux distribution, which he named Red Hat Linux (associated with the time Ewing wore a red Cornell University lacrosse hat, given to him by his grandfather, while attending Carnegie Mellon University). Ewing released the software in October, and it became known as the Halloween release. Young bought Ewing's business in 1995, and the two merged to become Red Hat Software, with Young as chief executive officer (CEO).

Red Hat went public on August 11, 1999, achieving—at the time—the eighth-biggest first-day gain in the history of Wall Street. Matthew Szulik succeeded Bob Young as CEO in December of that year. Bob Young went on to found the online print on demand and self-publishing company, Lulu in 2002.

On November 15, 1999, Red Hat acquired Cygnus Solutions. Cygnus provided commercial support for free software and housed maintainers of GNU software products such as the GNU Debugger and GNU Binutils. One of the founders of Cygnus, Michael Tiemann, became the chief technical officer of Red Hat and by 2008 the vice president of open-source affairs. Later Red Hat acquired WireSpeed, C2Net, Hell's Kitchen Systems, and Akopia.

In February 2000, InfoWorld awarded Red Hat its fourth consecutive "Operating System Product of the Year" award for Red Hat Linux 6.1. Red Hat acquired Planning Technologies, Inc. in 2001 and AOL's iPlanet directory and certificate-server software in 2004.

Red Hat moved its headquarters from Durham to North Carolina State University's Centennial Campus in Raleigh, North Carolina in February 2002. In the following month Red Hat introduced Red Hat Linux Advanced Server, later renamed Red Hat Enterprise Linux (RHEL). Dell, IBM, HP and Oracle Corporation announced their support of the platform.

In December 2005, CIO Insight magazine conducted its annual "Vendor Value Survey", in which Red Hat ranked #1 in value for the second year in a row. Red Hat stock became part of the NASDAQ-100 on December 19, 2005.

Red Hat acquired open-source middleware provider JBoss on June 5, 2006, and JBoss became a division of Red Hat. On September 18, 2006, Red Hat released the Red Hat Application Stack, which integrated the JBoss technology and which was certified by other well-known software vendors. On December 12, 2006, Red Hat stock moved from trading on NASDAQ (RHAT) to the New York Stock Exchange (RHT). In 2007 Red Hat acquired MetaMatrix and made an agreement with Exadel to distribute its software.

On March 15, 2007, Red Hat released Red Hat Enterprise Linux 5, and in June acquired Mobicents. On March 13, 2008, Red Hat acquired Amentra, a provider of systems integration services for service-oriented architecture, business process management, systems development, and enterprise data services.

On July 27, 2009, Red Hat replaced CIT Group in Standard and Poor's 500 stock index, a diversified index of 500 leading companies of the U.S. economy. This was reported as a major milestone for Linux.

On December 15, 2009, it was reported that Red Hat would pay US$8.8 million to settle a class action lawsuit related to the restatement of financial results from July 2004. The suit had been pending in the U.S. District Court for the Eastern District of North Carolina. Red Hat reached the proposed settlement agreement and recorded a one-time charge of US$8.8 million for the quarter that ended Nov. 30.

On January 10, 2011, Red Hat announced that it would expand its headquarters in two phases, adding 540 employees to the Raleigh operation, and investing over US$109 million. The state of North Carolina is offering up to US$15 million in incentives. The second phase involves "expansion into new technologies such as software virtualization and technology cloud offerings".

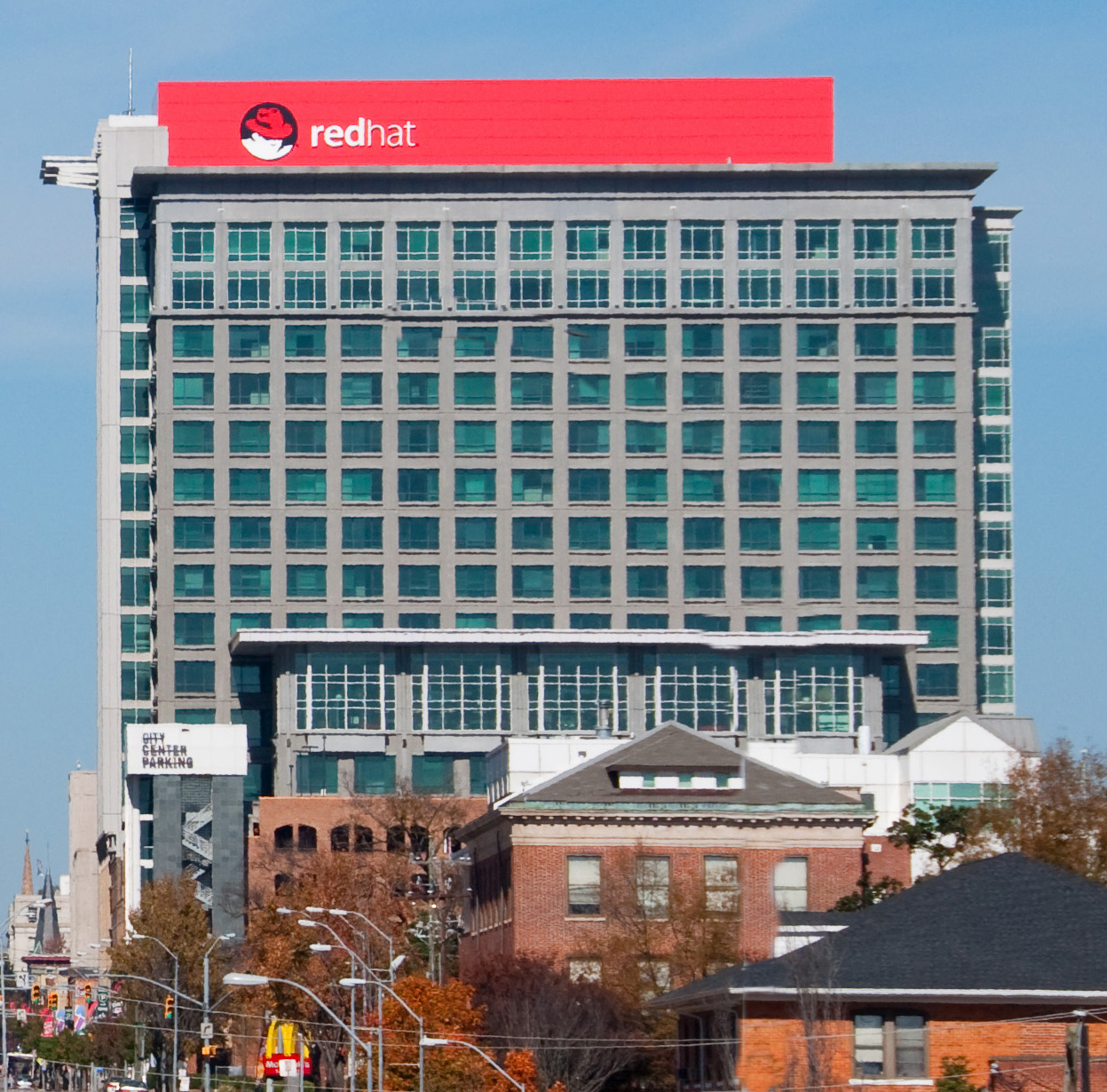
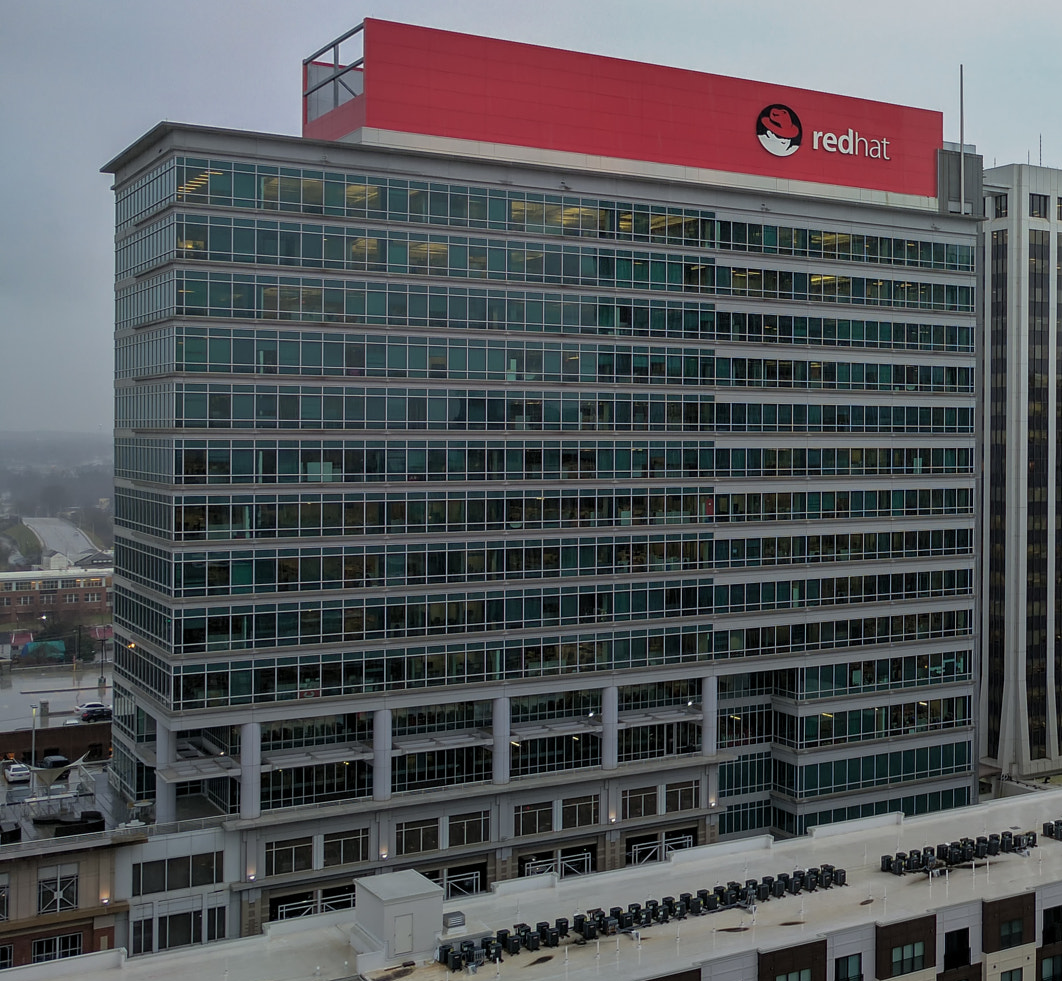
Red Hat Tower with earlier company logo

On August 25, 2011, Red Hat announced it would move about 600 employees from the N.C. State Centennial Campus to the Two Progress Plaza building. A ribbon cutting ceremony was held on June 24, 2013, in the re-branded Red Hat Headquarters.

In 2012, Red Hat became the first one-billion dollar open-source company, reaching US$1.13 billion in annual revenue during its fiscal year. Red Hat passed the $2 billion benchmark in 2015. As of February 2018 the company's annual revenue was nearly $3 billion.

On October 16, 2015, Red Hat announced its acquisition of IT automation startup Ansible, rumored for an estimated US$100 million.

In June 2017, Red Hat announced Red Hat Hyperconverged Infrastructure (RHHI) 1.0 software product.

In May 2018, Red Hat acquired CoreOS.

=== IBM subsidiary ===
On October 28, 2018, IBM announced its intent to acquire Red Hat for US$34 billion, in one of its largest-ever acquisitions. The company will operate out of IBM's Hybrid Cloud division. Microsoft, Amazon, and Google reportedly also considered buying Red Hat. Six months later, on May 3, 2019, the US Department of Justice concluded its review of IBM's proposed Red Hat acquisition, and according to Steven J. Vaughan-Nichols "essentially approved the IBM/Red Hat deal". The acquisition was closed on July 9, 2019. On January 12, 2026, Red Hat converted from a corporation to a limited liability company. In May 2026, IBM and Red Hat announced Project Lightwell, a $5 billion joint initiative to secure the open-source software supply chain through an AI-assisted vulnerability remediation clearinghouse. The initiative was expanded in June 2026 through a collaboration with Palo Alto Networks and commercially launched in July 2026 as Lightwell Network and Lightwell Clearinghouse Premier.

== Fedora Project ==
Fedora Project logo

Red Hat is the primary sponsor of the Fedora Project, a community-supported free software project that aims to promote the rapid progress of free and open-source software and content.

== Business model and customers ==
Red Hat operates on a business model based on open-source software, development within a community, professional quality assurance, and subscription-based customer support. They produce open-source code so that more programmers can make adaptations and improvements.

Red Hat sells subscriptions for the support, training, and integration services that help customers in using their open-source software products. Customers pay one set price for unlimited access to services such as Red Hat Network and up to 24/7 support.

In September 2014, however, CEO Jim Whitehurst announced that Red Hat was "in the midst of a major shift from client-server to cloud-mobile".

Rich Bynum, a member of Red Hat's legal team, attributes Linux's success and rapid development partially to open-source business models, including Red Hat's.

Red Hat's links to branches of Israel's military and statements of support for Israeli associates has also led to some controversy and calls for boycott during the ongoing conflict in Gaza.

Red Hat is a U.S. Air Force and US Department of Defense supplier, working closely with Lockheed Martin on warfare-related AI capabilities. In 2026, a brochure titled "Compress the kill cycle with Red Hat Device Edge" surfaced, but it was promptly removed from Red Hat websites. It was touting, among other things:

Red Hat® Device Edge embeds captured, analyzed, and federated data sets in a manner that positions the warfighter to use artificial intelligence and machine learning (AI/ML) to increase the accuracy of airborne targeting and mission-guidance systems.

== Programs and projects ==
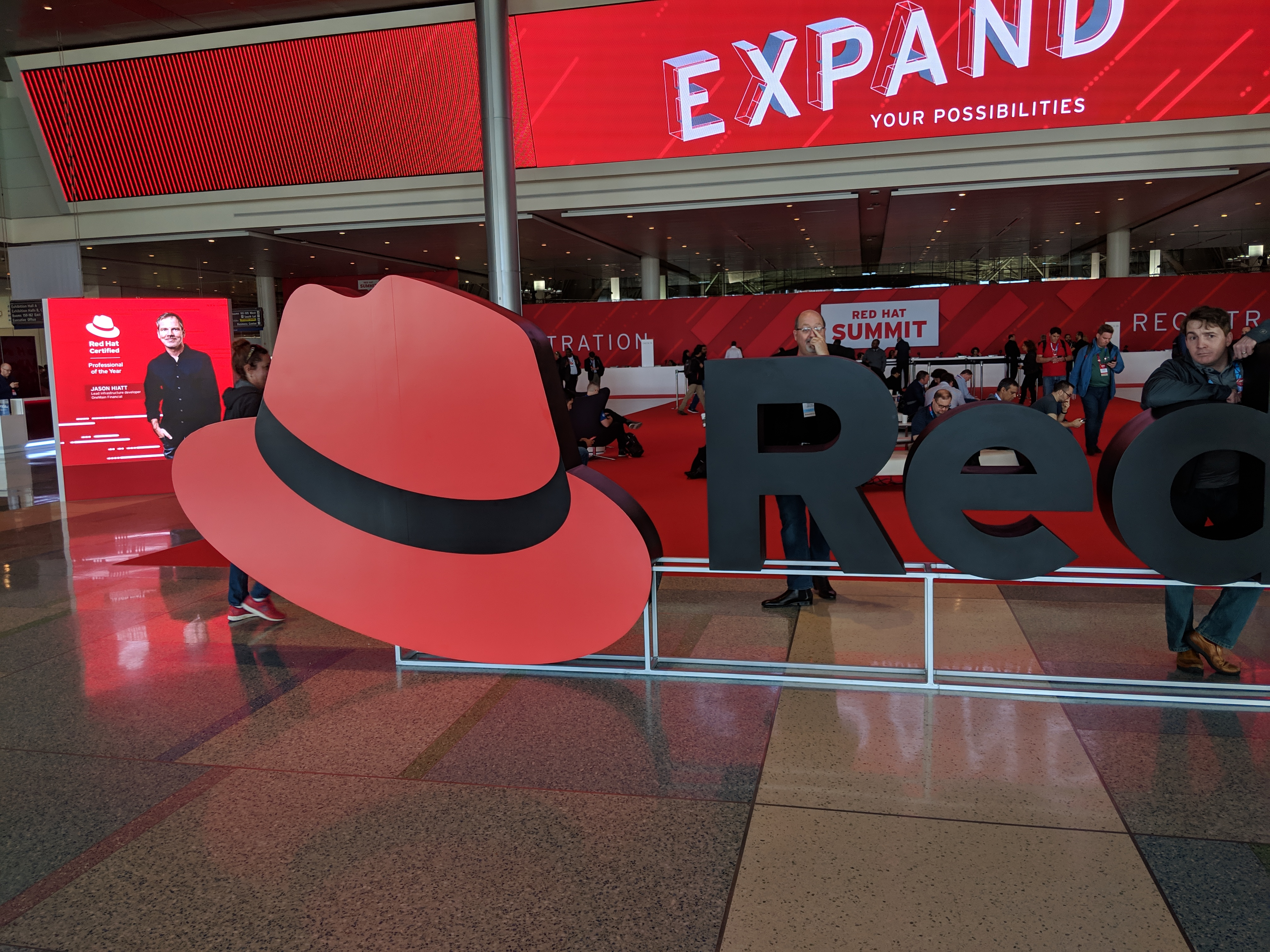
Red Hat Summit is an annual conference, here seen in 2019.

=== One Laptop per Child ===
Red Hat engineers worked with the One Laptop per Child initiative (a non-profit organization established by members of the MIT Media Lab) to design and produce an inexpensive laptop and try to provide every child in the world with access to open communication, open knowledge, and open learning. The XO-4 laptop, the last machine the project produced (in 2012), runs a slimmed-down version of Fedora 17 as its operating system.

=== KVM ===
Avi Kivity began the development of KVM in mid-2006 at Qumranet, a technology startup company that was acquired by Red Hat in 2008.

=== GNOME ===
Red Hat is the largest contributor to the GNOME desktop environment. It has several employees working full-time on Evolution, the official personal information manager for GNOME.

=== MRG ===
Red Hat MRG is a clustering product intended for integrated high-performance computing (HPC). The acronym MRG stands for "Messaging Realtime Grid".

Red Hat Enterprise MRG replaces the kernel of Red Hat Enterprise Linux RHEL, a Linux distribution developed by Red Hat, to provide extra support for real-time computing, together with middleware support for message brokerage and scheduling workload to local or remote virtual machines, grid computing, and cloud computing.

As of 2011, Red Hat works with the Condor High-Throughput Computing System community and also provides support for the software.

The Tuna performance-monitoring tool runs in the MRG environment.

=== Opensource.com ===
Red Hat produced the online publication Opensource.com since January 20, 2010. The site highlights ways open-source principles apply in domains other than software development. The site tracks the application of open-source philosophy to business, education, government, law, health, and life.

The company originally produced a newsletter called Under the Brim. Wide Open magazine first appeared in March 2004, as a means for Red Hat to share technical content with subscribers regularly. The Under the Brim newsletter and Wide Open magazine merged in November 2004, to become Red Hat Magazine. In January 2010, Red Hat Magazine became Opensource.com. In April 2023 Red Hat went through company layoffs and laid off the team maintaining Opensource.com.

=== Red Hat build of Keycloak ===
Red Hat build of Keycloak (formerly known as Red Hat Single Sign-On) is a software product to allow single sign-on with Identity Management and Access Management aimed at modern applications and services. It is based on the open-source project Keycloak, which acts as an upstream project.

=== Red Hat Subscription Management ===
Red Hat Subscription Management (RHSM) combines content delivery with subscription management.

=== Ceph Storage ===
Red Hat is the largest contributor to the Ceph Storage SDS project : Block, File & Object Storage which runs on industry-standard x86 servers and Ethernet IP as well as ARM, InfiniBand, and other technologies.

Ceph aims primarily for completely distributed operation without a single point of failure, scalable to the exabyte level.

Ceph replicates data and makes it fault-tolerant, using commodity hardware and requiring no specific hardware support. Ceph's system offers disaster recovery and data redundancy through techniques such as replication, erasure coding, snapshots and storage cloning. As a result of its design, the system is both self-healing and self-managing, aiming to minimize administration time and other costs.

In this way, administrators have a single, consolidated system that avoids silos and collects the storage within a common management framework. Ceph consolidates several storage use cases and improves resource utilization. It also lets an organization deploy servers where needed.

=== OpenShift ===
Red Hat operates OpenShift, a cloud computing platform as a service, supporting applications written in Node.js, PHP, Perl, Python, Ruby, JavaEE and more.

On July 31, 2018, Red Hat announced the release of Istio 1.0, a microservices management program used in tandem with the Kubernetes platform. The software purports to provide "traffic management, service identity and security, policy enforcement and telemetry" services in order to streamline Kubernetes use under the various Fedora-based operating systems. Red Hat's Brian Redbeard Harring described Istio as "aiming to be a control plane, similar to the Kubernetes control plane, for configuring a series of proxy servers that get injected between application components". Also Red Hat is the second largest contributor to Kubernetes code itself, after Google.

=== OpenStack ===
Red Hat markets a version of OpenStack which helps manage a data center in the manner of cloud computing.

=== CloudForms ===
Red Hat CloudForms provides management of virtual machines, instances and containers based on VMware vSphere, Red Hat Virtualization, Microsoft Hyper-V, OpenStack, Amazon EC2, Google Cloud Platform, Microsoft Azure, and Red Hat OpenShift. CloudForms is based on the ManageIQ project that Red Hat open sourced. Code in ManageIQ is from the over US$100 million acquisition of ManageIQ in 2012.

=== CoreOS ===
Container Linux (formerly CoreOS Linux) is a discontinued open-source lightweight operating system based on the Linux kernel and designed for providing infrastructure to clustered deployments. As an operating system, Container Linux provided only the minimal functionality required for deploying applications inside software containers, together with built-in mechanisms for service discovery and configuration sharing.

=== LibreOffice ===
Red Hat contributed, with several software developers, to LibreOffice, a free and open-source office suite. However, in 2023, Red Hat announced they were not going to include LibreOffice in RHEL 10, citing the ability to download LibreOffice from Flatpak on RHEL desktops.

=== Other FOSS projects ===
Red Hat also organises "Open Source Day" events where multiple partners show their open-source technologies.

=== Xorg ===
Red Hat was one of the largest contributors to the X Window System.

==== Wayland/Weston ====
Started in 2008, by Red Hat developer Kristian Høgsberg, with the aim of replacing the X Windows System.

=== Utilities and tools ===
Subscribers have access to:

- Red Hat Developer Toolset (DTS) – performance analysis and development tools
- Red Hat Software Collections (RHSCL)

Over and above Red Hat's major products and acquisitions, Red Hat programmers have produced software programming-tools and utilities to supplement standard Unix and Linux software. Some of these Red Hat "products" have found their way from specifically Red Hat operating environments via open-source channels to a wider community. Such utilities include:

- Disk Druid – for disk partitioning
- rpm – for package management
- sos (son of sysreport) – tools for collecting information on system hardware and configuration.
  - sosreport – reports system hardware and configuration details
- SystemTap – tracing tool for Linux kernels, developed with IBM, Hitachi, Oracle and Intel
- NetworkManager

The Red Hat website lists the organization's major involvements in free and open-source software projects.

Community projects under the aegis of Red Hat include:

- the Pulp application for software repository management.

== Subsidiaries ==
=== Red Hat Czech ===
Red Hat Czech

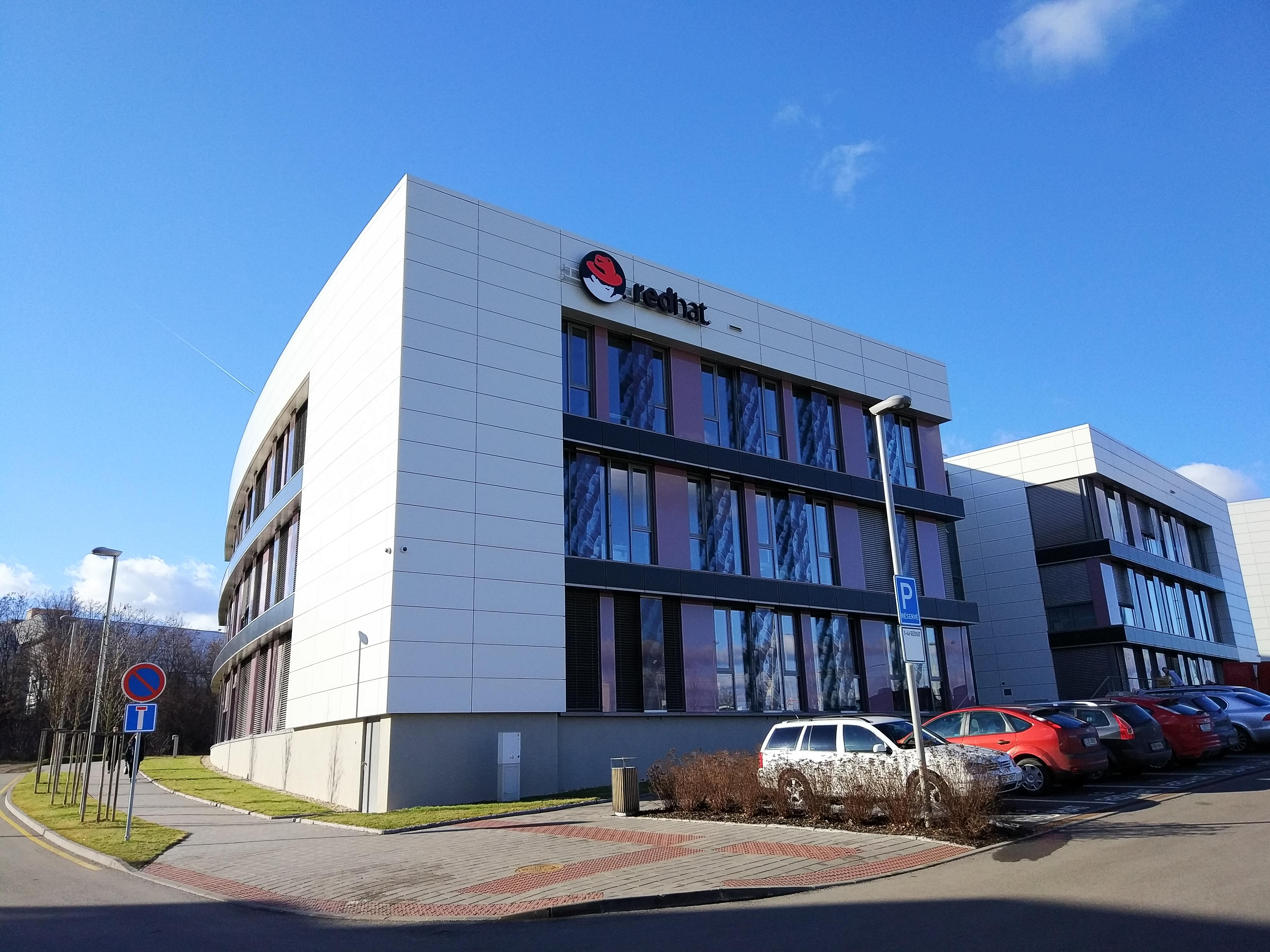
- Red Hat building in Brno
- Type: Společnost s ručením omezeným (Limited Liability Company)
- Industry: Software
- Predecessor: Container Linux; Cygnus Solutions
- Founded: 2006; 20 years ago
- Headquarters: Brno, Czech Republic
- Revenue: ▲CZK 1,002 million (FY 2016); CZK 806 million (FY 2015)
- Net income: ▲CZK 123 million (FY 2016); CZK 39 million (FY 2015)
- Total assets: ▲CZK 420 million (FY 2016); CZK 325 million (FY 2015)
- Number of employees: 1180 (2019)
- Parent: Red Hat
- Website: redhat.com/en/global/czech-republic

Red Hat Czech s.r.o. is subsidiary headquartered in Brno, where the company operates a major engineering center. Red Hat began building the Brno development center in 2004, and Red Hat Czech s.r.o. was incorporated in 2006. CzechInvest reported in 2007 that Red Hat had chosen Brno for its technical talent base and expected extensive cooperation with local universities, particularly Masaryk University.

The Brno operation subsequently grew into Red Hat's largest engineering office. Around 1,500 people are employed at the center, approximately 80% of them in software development. Engineering work at the site has included Red Hat Enterprise Linux, middleware, cloud and storage technologies, OpenShift, OpenStack and IoT. The Brno engineering site also has long-standing academic partnerships with Masaryk University and Brno University of Technology, with cooperation including research projects, teaching, thesis supervision and student programs.

=== Red Hat India ===
In 2000, Red Hat created the subsidiary Red Hat India to deliver Red Hat software, support, and services to Indian customers. As of today (2025 December) 1800 employees work for Red Hat India. Colin Tenwick, former vice president and general manager of Red Hat EMEA, said Red Hat India was opened "in response to the rapid adoption of Red Hat Linux in the subcontinent. Demand for open-source solutions from the Indian markets is rising and Red Hat wants to play a major role in this region." Red Hat India has worked with local companies to enable the adoption of open-source technology in both government and education.

In 2006, Red Hat India had a distribution network of more than 70 channel partners spanning 27 cities across India. Red Hat India's channel partners included MarkCraft Solutions, Ashtech Infotech Pvt Ltd., Efensys Technologies, Embee Software, Allied Digital Services, and Softcell Technologies. Distributors include Integra Micro Systems and Ingram Micro.

== Mergers and acquisitions ==
Red Hat's first major acquisition involved Delix Computer GmbH-Linux Div, the Linux-based operating-system division of Delix Computer, a German computer company, on July 30, 1999.

Red Hat acquired Cygnus Solutions, a company that provided commercial support for free software, on January 11, 2000 – it was the company's largest acquisition, for US$674 million. Michael Tiemann, co-founder of Cygnus, was the chief technical officer of Red Hat after the acquisition. Red Hat made the most acquisitions in 2000 with five: Cygnus Solutions, Bluecurve, Wirespeed Communications, Hell's Kitchen Systems, and C2Net. On June 5, 2006, Red Hat acquired open-source middleware provider JBoss for US$420 million and integrated it as its own division of Red Hat.

On December 14, 1998, Red Hat made its first divestment, when Intel and Netscape acquired undisclosed minority stakes in the company. The next year, on March 9, 1999, Compaq, IBM, Dell and Novell each acquired undisclosed minority stakes in Red Hat.

=== Acquisitions ===
Date	Company	Business	Country	Value (USD)	References
July 13, 1999	Atomic Vision	Website design	United States	—	
July 30, 1999	Delix Computer GmbH -Linux Div (Note: Delix Computer GmbH-Linux Div was acquired from Delix Computer.)	Computers and software	Germany	—	
January 11, 2000	Cygnus Solutions Limited	gcc, gdb, binutils, Cygwin	United States	$674,444,000	
May 26, 2000	Bluecurve	IT management software	United States	$37,107,000	
August 1, 2000	Wirespeed Communications	Internet software	United States	$83,963,000	
August 15, 2000	Hell's Kitchen Systems	Internet software	United States	$85,624,000	
September 13, 2000	C2Net	Internet software	United States	$39,983,000	
February 5, 2001	Akopia	Ecommerce software	United States	—	
February 28, 2001	Planning Technologies	Consulting	United States	$47,000,000	
February 11, 2002	ArsDigita	Assets and employees	United States	—	
October 15, 2002	NOCpulse	Software	United States	—	
December 18, 2003	Sistina Software	GFS, LVM, DM	United States	$31,000,000	
September 30, 2004	The Netscape Security -Certain Asts (Note: Netscape Security-Certain Asts was acquired from Netscape Security Solutions.)	Certain assets	United States	—	
June 5, 2006	JBoss	Middleware	France	$420,000,000	
June 6, 2007	MetaMatrix	Information management software	United States	—	
June 19, 2007	Mobicents	Telecommunications software	United States	—	
March 13, 2008	Amentra	Consulting	United States	—	
June 4, 2008	Identyx	Software	United States	—	
September 4, 2008	Qumranet	KVM, RHEV, SPICE	Israel	$107,000,000	
November 30, 2010	Makara	Enterprise software	United States	—	
October 4, 2011	Gluster	GlusterFS	United States	$136,000,000	
June 27, 2012	FuseSource	Enterprise integration software	United States	—	
August 28, 2012	Polymita	Enterprise software	Spain	—	
December 20, 2012	ManageIQ	Orchestration software	United States	$104,000,000	
January 7, 2014	The CentOS Project	CentOS	United States	—	
April 30, 2014	Inktank Storage	Ceph	United States	$175,000,000	
June 18, 2014	eNovance	OpenStack Integration Services	France	$95,000,000	
September 18, 2014	FeedHenry	Mobile Application Platform	Ireland	$82,000,000	
October 16, 2015	Ansible	Configuration management, Orchestration engine	United States	—	
June 22, 2016	3scale	API management	United States	—	
May 25, 2017	Codenvy	Cloud software	United States	—	
July 31, 2017	Permabit	Data deduplication and compression	United States	—	
January 30, 2018	CoreOS	Management of containerized application: Container Linux by CoreOS	United States	$250,000,000	
November 28, 2018	NooBaa	Cloud storage technology	Israel	—	
January 7, 2021	StackRox	Container management software	United States	—	
December 16, 2025	Chatterbox	NLP and machine learning solutions	United Kingdom		147

=== Divestitures ===
Date	Acquirer	Target company	Target business	Acquirer country	Value (USD)	References
December 14, 1998	Intel Corporation	Red Hat (Note: Intel Corporation acquired a minority stake in Red Hat.)	Open-source software	United States	—	
March 9, 1999	Compaq	Red Hat (Note: Compaq acquired a minority stake in Red Hat.)	Open-source software	United States	—	
March 9, 1999	IBM	Red Hat (Note: IBM acquired a minority stake in Red Hat.)	Open-source software	United States	—	
March 9, 1999	Novell	Red Hat (Note: Novell acquired a minority stake in Red Hat)	Open-source software	United States	—	
