= Timeline of Amazon Web Services =

This is a timeline of Amazon Web Services, which offers a suite of cloud computing services that make up an on-demand computing platform.

== Background and development ==
Year	Month and date (if available)	Event type	Details
2000		Prelude	Amazon.com, the parent company of the as yet nonexistent Amazon Web Services (AWS), begins work on merchant.com, an e-commerce platform intended for use by other large retailers such as Target Corporation. In the process, Amazon's team realizes that they need to decouple their code better, with cleaner interfaces and access APIs. Around the same time, the company also realizes the need to build infrastructure as a service internally, to improve the speed of development and not have it bottlenecked by infrastructure availability. All these changes help pave the way for AWS.
2003		Prelude	Benjamin Black and Chris Pinkham write a short paper describing a vision for Amazon infrastructure that, in Black's words, "was completely standardized, completely automated, and relied extensively on web services for things like storage."
2004		Prelude	Jeff Bezos approves the idea of experimenting with Amazon infrastructure. Pinkham leaves for South Africa to set up a satellite development office. While there, he works on a pilot along with help from Chris Brown and Willem van Biljon. Although the team works from South Africa, the servers are hosted in the United States.
2004	November 9	Customer outreach	The Amazon Web Services blog is launched, with a first blog post by Jeff Barr. At the time, the name Amazon Web Services refers to a collection of APIs and tools to access the Amazon.com catalog, rather than the infrastructure as a service it would eventually become.
2005		Prelude	A private precursor to AWS launches, with a small number of customers. At the same time, Amazon begins planning for a public launch of AWS. Based on internal discussions, they decide to launch storage, compute, and database offerings so that developers can use all of them together.

== Operation ==
Year	Month and date (if available)	Event type	Details
2006	March 14	Product (storage)	Amazon Web Services launches by releasing the Simple Storage Service (S3).
2006	July 13	Product (data flow)	Amazon Simple Queue Service (SQS) is released in production. SQS had been around (but not available in production) since 2004.
2006	August 25	Product (compute)	Amazon launches Amazon Elastic Compute Cloud (EC2), which forms a central part of Amazon.com's cloud-computing platform, Amazon Web Services (AWS), by allowing users to rent virtual computers on which to run their own computer applications. The service initially includes machines (instances) available for 10 cents an hour, and is available only to existing AWS customers rather than the general public. The EC2 region is us-east-1, also known as compute-1, and is located in North Virginia.
2007	August 22	Product (compute)	Amazon EC2 is now available in unlimited public beta, so that anybody can sign up and start using it. It also launches new instance types.
2007	November 6	Regional diversification	Amazon launches S3 in Europe, reducing latency and bandwidth for European users and helping them comply with privacy requirements.
2007	December 13	Product (database)	Amazon launches Amazon SimpleDB, which allows businesses, researchers, data analysts, and developers to easily and cheaply process vast amounts of data. It uses a hosted Hadoop framework running on the web-scale infrastructure of EC2 and Amazon S3.
2008	March 26	Product, regional diversification	Amazon announces Elastic IPs, IP addresses that can be decoupled from physical EC2 machines, as well as availability zones, clusters of one or more data centers in a region such that different availability zones are isolated from each other in terms of power and water sources.
2008	April 7	Competition	Google launches Google App Engine, a platform as a service (PaaS) cloud computing platform for developing and hosting web applications in Google-managed data centers. This is part of the Google Cloud.
2008	August 20	Product (storage)	Amazon announces the launch of Amazon Elastic Block Store (EBS), which provides raw block-level storage that can be attached to Amazon EC2 instances.
2008	October 23	Product (service)	Amazon EC2 exits beta and begins offering a service level agreement.
2008	November 18	Product (Internet delivery)	AWS launches Amazon CloudFront, a content delivery network (CDN).
2008	December 10	Regional diversification	Amazon launches EC2 in Europe (specifically, the region eu-west-1 in Ireland), making it easier for European customers to run their instances locally and benefit from higher bandwidth and lower latency. This comes a year after the setting up of S3 in Europe.
2009	April	Product (compute)	Amazon launches Amazon Elastic MapReduce (EMR), which allows businesses, researchers, data analysts, and developers to easily and cheaply process vast amounts of data. It uses a hosted Hadoop framework running on the web-scale infrastructure of EC2 and Amazon S3.
2009	May 18	Product (compute)	Amazon introduces Elastic Load Balancing (ELB) (which makes it easy for users to distribute web traffic across Amazon EC2 instances), Auto Scaling (which allows users to scale policies driven by metrics collected by Amazon CloudWatch), and Amazon CloudWatch (for tracking per-instance performance metrics including CPU load).
2009	May 21	Product (data migration)	AWS announces an Import/Export service, whereby people can send their storage device to AWS and AWS will upload the data to S3. This is a predecessor of the Snowball service that they would launch in October 2015.
2009	Aug 25	Product (networking)	AWS launches Virtual Private Cloud (VPC), allowing customers launch EC2 instances into their own logically isolated networks, with the ability to define subnets, routing and access control lists.
2009	October 22	Product (database)	Amazon launches Amazon Relational Database Service (RDS), a web service running "in the cloud" designed to simplify the setup, operation, and scaling of a relational database for use in applications. It starts out by supporting MySQL databases.
2009	December 3	Regional diversification	AWS launches in a second region in the United States called us-west-1, located in Northern California.
2009	December 13	Product (compute)	AWS announces EC2 Spot Instances, allowing users to bid for one or more EC2 instances at the price they are willing to pay.
2010	February	Competition	Microsoft launches Microsoft Azure, its foray into cloud computing.
2010	April 7	Product (Internet delivery)	AWS launches Simple Notification Service (SNS), a tool to allow developers to push messages generated from an application to other systems and people (by methods such as email or webhooks).
2010	April 29	Regional diversification	AWS launches a region, called ap-southeast-1, in Singapore. This is its first region in the Asia-Pacific, and is intended to meet the demand for lower latency and better bandwidth for the growing customer base in the Asia-Pacific region.
2010	May 15	Product (management)	Amazon launches AWS CloudFormation, its tool to help customers define collections of AWS resources (called stacks) with AWS taking care of using the definitions to provision and configure the required resources. CloudFormation is an early example of a declarative Infrastructure as Code tool.
2010	Sep 2	IAM (security)	AWS launches identity and access management (IAM) – Preview Beta.
2010	November	Product	Amazon announces that Amazon.com has migrated its retail web services to AWS.
2010	December 5	Product (Internet delivery)	AWS launches Amazon Route 53, a scalable and highly available Domain Name System that can be accessed via programmatic APIs.
2011	January 19	Product (management)	AWS launches AWS Elastic Beanstalk, an orchestration service for deploying infrastructure which orchestrates AWS services including EC2, S3, SNS, CloudWatch, autoscaling, and Elastic Load Balancers.
2011	January 25	Product (Internet delivery)	AWS announces the launch of Amazon Simple Email Service (SES), a service for large-scale email delivery. A week later, MailChimp announces its own Simple Transaction Service (STS) for bulk email delivery using SES.
2011	March 2	Regional diversification	AWS launches a new region, named ap-northeast-1 in Tokyo, Japan, its second in the Asia-Pacific region. The region is launched to meet the needs of AWS' current and potential Japanese customer base for low latency and better bandwidth.
2011	June 21	Competition	DigitalOcean launches. By November 2015, it becomes the second largest hosting company in the world in terms of web-facing computers.
2011	July 19	Ecosystem	Netflix announces its suite of tools ("Simian Army") including Chaos Monkey, that randomly terminates EC2 instances within an autoscaling group during working hours so that the company is forced to design its systems with fault tolerance and rapid recovery.
2011	November 9	Regional diversification	AWS launches a new region called us-west-2 and located in Oregon, its third region in the United States for general public use.
2011	December 14	Regional diversification	AWS launches a new region, called sa-east-1, in São Paulo, Brazil. This is its first region in South America.
2012	January 18	Product (database)	Amazon launches Amazon DynamoDB, a fully managed proprietary NoSQL database service that is offered by Amazon.com as part of the Amazon Web Services portfolio.
2012	April 29	Ecosystem	AWS Marketplace is "an online store where customers can find, buy, and quickly deploy software that runs on AWS."
2012	June 11	Product (security)	Amazon launches AWS Identity and Access Management (IAM) for EC2.
2012	July 30	Ecosystem	Netflix open sources Chaos Monkey, its tool for simulating outages by randomly terminating EC2 instances, to help other companies build fault tolerant systems in the AWS cloud.
2012	July 30	Product (storage)	Provisioned IOPS (PIOPs) are a new EBS volume type designed to deliver predictable, higher performance for I/O intensive workloads.
2012	August 21	Product (storage)	Amazon launches Amazon Glacier, an online file storage web service that provides storage for data archiving and backup.
2012	November	Product (storage)	AWS announces Amazon Redshift, a cloud-based data warehouse service.
2012	November 12	Regional diversification	AWS launches a region, ap-southeast-2, in Sydney, Australia. This is its third region in the Asia-Pacific and its eighth public region (excluding AWS GovCloud).
2013	March 26	Product	AWS CloudHSM
2013	May 13	Recognition	AWS is awarded an Agency Authority to Operate (ATO) from the U.S. Department of Health and Human Services (HHS) under the Federal Risk and Authorization Management Program (FedRAMP).
2013	June 4	Competition	IBM acquires SoftLayer, which marks IBM's entry into cloud computing.
2013	October 10	Customer outreach	AWS announces AWS Activate, a global program for startups. Participating startups receive promotional credits that can be spent within AWS, as well as training, support, and access to a forum.
2013	November 4	Product (compute)	Amazon announces G2 instances, a new Amazon Elastic Compute Cloud (EC2) instance type designed for applications that require 3D graphics capabilities.
2013	November 13	Product	Amazon announces AWS CloudTrail, a web service that delivers logs of API calls made on the user's account to Amazon S3 buckets.
2013	December 17	Product (data flow)	Amazon releases Amazon Kinesis, a service for real-time processing of streaming data.
2013	December 18	Regional diversification	AWS launches in China, with a limited preview of its Beijing region. However, due to Internet censorship in China, its China data center is not part of the global AWS network. Rather, it is a standalone region with the same APIs and services as available in other AWS regions, but a user must create a separate AWS account for AWS China and cannot use the AWS Global account. The service operator is Beijing Sinnet Technology Co.
2014	August	Security Certification	AWS first to achieve MTCS Level 3 Certification.
2014	October 23	Regional diversification	AWS launches its second region in Europe, specifically, eu-central-1 in Frankfurt, Germany.
2014	November 12	Product (database)	AWS announces Amazon Aurora, a MySQL-compatible database offering enhanced high availability and performance. The feature becomes available to all AWS customers on July 27, 2015.
2014	November 12	Product (security)	AWS Key Management Service
2014	November 13	Product (compute)	AWS launches a preview of EC2 Container Service (ECS), facilitating the use of container infrastructure on AWS. Third-party integration such as those with Docker are available at the time of release.
2014	November 13	Product (compute)	AWS launches AWS Lambda, its Functions as a Service (FaaS) tool. With Lambda, AWS customers can define and upload functions with specific triggers and execution code. AWS takes care of executing the function on the trigger occurring, and the AWS customer does not have to provision or manage the compute resources. Lambda is an early harbinger of the concept of "serverless architecture", referring to the idea of providing services without having dedicated servers to provide those services.
2014	December 17	Product	Introduction of Resource Groups and Tag Editor in AWS Management Console
2015	February 12	Product	Introduction of permission and privileged policies managed by Amazon in AWS Identity & Access Management (IAM).
2015	April 9	Product	AWS announces a new machine learning platform at the AWS Summit in San Francisco, specifically suited to machine learning without requiring specific expertise.
2015	April 28	Acquisitions	AWS acquires ClusterK, a startup that allows users to run apps on Amazon's cloud for 1/10th of the regular price.
2015	May 19	Evaluation	Gartner releases an updated version of its Magic Quadrant, evaluating Infrastructure as a Service (IaaS) offerings. Amazon Web Services and Microsoft Azure are the only two services in the top right quadrant ("Leaders") with AWS higher up. A number of services are in the bottom right and bottom left quadrants.
2015	July 9	Product	AWS CodePipeline continuous delivery service
2015	July 9	Product	AWS launches AWS API Gateway Service.
2015	October 1	Product	AWS launches AWS Elasticsearch Service.
2015	October 7	Product	AWS Inspector preview will be available soon.
2015	October 7	QuickSight	Amazon QuickSight – Fast & Easy to Use Business Intelligence for Big Data at 1/10th the Cost of Traditional Solutions.
2015	October 7	Product (data migration)	AWS launches Snowball, a physical appliance with 50 TB of storage and a Kindle on the side. Customers can get a Snowball for 10 days for $200, during which they can fill it with data and then ship it back to Amazon. The Snowball costs $15 for every additional day kept. This is the second generation of their data import/export hardware after a previous release in 2009.
2015	October 8	Product (Internet of Things)	AWS announces its managed cloud platform for the Internet of Things. The platform becomes generally available on December 18, 2015.
2015	December 21	Product	AWS announces an Amazon Elastic Container Registry (ECR), a fully managed Docker container registry.
2016	January 6	Regional diversification	AWS launches a new region, called ap-northeast-2, in Seoul, the capital city of South Korea. The region is the fourth in the Asia-Pacific.
2016	March	Partnerships, Competition	Dropbox announces that it now stores over 90% of its user data on its own infrastructure stack as it continues to transition from Amazon S3.
2016	May 18	Product (Computing)	AWS announces Automatic Auto Scaling for Amazon EC2 Container Service (ECS) services.
2016	June 21	Product (Computing)	AWS announces AWS Certificate Manager (ACM) to provisioning and managing SSL/TLS certificates.
2016	June 27	Regional diversification	AWS launches its first region in India, located in Mumbai, and called ap-south-1.
2016	June 28	Product (storage)	AWS launches Elastic File System (EFS) in production in three AWS regions (us-east-1, us-west-2, and eu-west-1). EFS allows customers to create POSIX-compliant file systems that can be attached to multiple EC2 instances. The file system grows and shrinks as needed and performance scales with storage size. The service was originally announced on April 9, 2015.
2016	July 14	Acquisitions	AWS acquires Cloud9, a San Francisco–based startup that has built an integrated development environment (IDE) for web and mobile developers to collaborate.
2016	August 4	Evaluation	Gartner publishes an update to its Magic Quadrant for Infrastructure as a Service (IaaS) offerings. The top right quadrant (for leaders) has only two players: Amazon Web Services and Microsoft Azure, with AWS significantly higher. The only other player on the right half is Google Cloud Platform (a change from last year, when there were many others in the right half as well), and all other players are in the bottom left.
2016	October 13	Partnerships	VMWare, a company that provides cloud and virtualization services, announces a partnership with AWS, under which all of VMware's infrastructure will soon be available on AWS.
2016	October 17	Regional diversification	AWS launches its fourth public region in the United States, called us-east-2, in Ohio, with three availability zones. AWS also announces that it will treat this region and the North Virginia region as one region when considering transfer pricing (for instance, EC2 to EC2 transfer will be charged at the inter-availability zone price, and S3 to EC2 transfer will be free), allowing its customers to have more regional redundancy and to migrate data off of the North Virginia data center.
2016	November 30	Product (data migration)	AWS announces the AWS Snowmobile, a secure data truck that can store up to 100 PB of data and supports data transfer at a rate of 1 Tb/second across multiple 40 Gb/second connections (so the truck can be filled in 10 days).
2016	November 30	Product (Internet of Things, data migration)	AWS announces Snowball Edge, an augmentation of its previous device Snowball. Snowball Edge is a piece of hardware with 100 TB of storage and an attached Kindle, as well as the capability to run AWS Lambda functions with the compute capability of the m4.4xlarge EC2 instance. Customers can request a Snowball Edge at $300 for ten days with an additional charge of $30 per day; after shipping it back the data can be uploaded to S3 as with the original Snowball.
2016	November 30	Product	AWS announces Amazon Lightsail, intended to compete against existing virtual private server offerings such as those by Linode and DigitalOcean. Lightsail packages together a compute server, storage, and transfer into fixed-price plans, like VPS providers do. Lightsail is a little more expensive than but otherwise comparable to similarly priced plans offered at the time by Linode and DigitalOcean. Linode is cheaper in terms of RAM and both Linode and DigitalOcean are cheaper in terms of network overage costs, but Lightsail costs less if the server is being spun up for only a few hours.
2016	November 30	Product	Amazon Polly text-to-speech product
2016	November 30	Product (AI)	Amazon Rekognition pre-trained computer vision API
2016	November 30	Product (AI)	Amazon Lex chatbot builder
2016	December 1	Product	Amazon Pinpoint tool designed to let developers send targeted push notifications.
2016	December 1	Product	Amazon Step Functions tool design to coordinate the components of distributed applications and microservices using visual workflows.
2016	December 8	Regional diversification	AWS launches its first region in Canada, called ca-central-1 for Canada (Central).
2016	December 13	Regional diversification	AWS launches its London region (eu-west-2). This is its third region in Europe and first in the United Kingdom, the other two regions being in Frankfurt (Germany) and Ireland. Plans for the region had been announced in November 2015.
2016	December 22	Product (Compute)	AWS EC2 Systems Manager management service to automate configuration and magament of EC2 and On-Premises Systems.
2017	February 23	Product (compute)	AWS launches i3 instances, a new generation of instances with large SSDs intended to be used for high-throughput datastores. The instances are more than 50% cheaper than the corresponding previous generation i2 instances, and have larger memory.
2017	August 14	Product (database)	Amazon Glue – a fully managed extract, transform, and load (ETL) service
2017	August 30	Product (database)	Amazon Aurora with PostgreSQL Compatibility
2017	October 24	Product (database)	Amazon Aurora Fast Database Cloning feature
2017	November 8	Product	Amazon MQ fully managed service for open source message brokers
2017	November 9	Product	AWS Privatelink
2017	November 29	Product	Amazon Systems Manager user interface to view operational data and automate operational task.
2017	November 29	Product	AWS Fargate service for deploying and managing containers without having to manage any of the underlying infrastructure
2017	November 29	Product (AI)	Amazon SageMaker managed machine learning service
2017	November 29	Product (AI)	Amazon Translate provides natural language translation.
2017	November 29	Product (AI)	Amazon Transcribe is an automatic speech recognition software.
2017	December 14	Product	AWS CloudWatch agent for Linux and Windows which allows collection of disk and memory metrics as well as logs.
2017	December 18	Regional diversification	AWS launches its Paris region (eu-west-3). Paris joins Ireland, Frankfurt, and London as the fourth AWS Region in Europe.
2017	December 18	Product	AWS OpsWorks for Chef Automate and AWS OpsWorks for Puppet Enterprise become available in nine regions.
2018	April 4	Product (security)	Amazon launches AWS Secrets Manager which manages the storage, distribution, and rotation of secrets via API, the AWS Command Line Interface (CLI), and AWS Lambda functions.
2018	June 5	Product (compute)	AWS Elastic Kubernetes Service (EKS) available in the US East (N. Virginia) and US West (Oregon) Regions.
2018	September 11–12	Acquisitions	Amazon acquires the aws.com domain from Earth Networks, formerly known as Automated Weather Source.
2018	November	Product	AWS Ground Station is released.
2018	November 26	Product	AWS Global Accelerator, a network service used to route data over Amazon's private network
2018	November 26	Product (CPU)	AWS Graviton CPU powered EC2 A1 instances are publicly available in 4 regions.
2018	November 28	Product (compute)	AWS launches hibernation for EC2 instances.
2018	November 28	Product (AI)	Amazon Textract is a "service that automatically extracts text and data from scanned documents."
2018	November 28	Product	AWS Lake Formation simplifies the process of setting up and maintaining a data lake.
2018	November 28	Product (AI)	Amazon Personalize enables developers to create their own recommendation engines.
2018	November 28	Product (AI)	Amazon Forecast allows customers to use their historical data produce forecasts for topics such as inventory levels and product demand.
2018	November 29	Product (AI)	Amazon DeepLens is a wireless video camera. DeepLens is designed such that customers can deploy their own deep learning models for computer vision onto the camera.
2018	November 29	Product (compute)	Amazon MSK: Amazon Managed Streaming for Kafka in Public Preview
2018	November 29	Product	AWS Well-Architected Tool: review workloads against the latest AWS architectural best practices, and get guidance on how to improve cloud architectures
2019	January 16	Product (compute)	Amazon Backup service for Amazon EBS volumes, RDS databases, DynamoDB tables, EFS file systems and AWS Storage Gateway volumes limited to a given AWS region.
2019	March	Product	AWS App Mesh, a service mesh that provides application level networking
2019	July 29	Regional diversification	Amazon launches me-south-1 in Bahrain.
2019	September 10	Product	Amazon Quantum Ledger Database
2019	December 3	Product (CPU)	AWS Graviton2 CPU powered EC2 M6g, C6g, and R6g instances are launched.
2019	December 3	Product (compute)	AWS Outposts allows AWS services to run in non-AWS datacenters.
2019	December 3	Product	AWS Wavelength
2020	April 22	Product	Amazon AppFlow, a fully managed integration service to securely transfer data between third-party SaaS offerings and AWS services.
2020	April 22	Regional diversification	Amazon launches af-south-1 in Cape Town.
2020	April 27	Regional diversification	Amazon launches eu-south-1 in Milan.
2020	May 11	Product	Amazon Kendra, an intelligent enterprise search service powered by machine learning
2020	June 24	Product	Amazon Honeycode, a no-code platform for web and mobile application development
2020	July 9	Product	AWS Copilot
2020	September 30	Product (database)	Amazon Timestream, a time series database
2020	December 1	Product	Amazon CodeGuru, a developer tool that uses machine learning-based recommendations to improve code quality
2021	March 1	Regional diversification	AWS expands Osaka Local Region (ap-northeast-3) to a standard AWS region with 3 Availability Zones
2021	May 18	Product	AWS App Runner, a fully managed container application service
2021	August 19	Product	Amazon MemoryDB, an in-memory database service with API compatible with that of Redis.
2021	November 30	Product (CPU)	AWS Graviton3 CPU powered EC2 C7g instances are launched in preview.
2021	November 30	Product	AWS Outposts Servers in Two Form Factors
2021	December 2	Product	Amazon announces AWS re:Post, a crowd-sourced and expert-reviewed Q&A service for technical questions about AWS that replaces the original AWS Forums.
2021	December 6	Regional diversification	Amazon launches AWS Top Secret-West.
2022	July 7	Product (CPU)	Apple M1 System on Chip powered EC2 M1 Mac instances launched.
2022	November 22	Regional diversification	Amazon launches ap-south-2 in Hyderabad.
2023	January 23	Regional diversification	Amazon launches ap-southeast-4 in Melbourne.
2023	February 13	Product	M7g and R7g instances powered by the latest generation AWS Graviton3 processors now available which are designed to deliver up to 25% better performance than the equivalent sixth-generation (M6g and R6g) instances.
2023	April 3	Product	AWS Service Catalog support for Terraform open source.
2023	April 13	Product (AI)	Amazon CodeWhisperer, real-time AI coding companion.
2023	April 20	Product	Amazon CodeCatalyst, unified software development service.
2023	May 4	Product (AI)	ml.inf2 (Inferentia2) and ml.trn1 (Trainium) family of instances on Amazon SageMaker for deploying machine learning (ML) models for Real-time and Asynchronous inference.
2023	May 30	Product	Amazon Security Lake, centralized data lake for cloud and on-premises security data.
2023	August 1	Regional diversification	Amazon launches il-central-1 in Israel (Tel Aviv).
2023	September 28	Product (AI)	Amazon Bedrock, a fully managed service for AI foundation models.
2023	October 10	Solution (AI)	Generative AI Application Builder on AWS facilitates the development, rapid experimentation, and deployment of generative artificial intelligence (AI) applications without requiring deep experience in AI.
2023	November 28	Product (AI)	Amazon announces Amazon Q, a virtual assistant using generative AI.
2023	November 27	Product (AI)	Amazon SageMaker HyperPod reduces time to train foundation models (FMs) by up to 40% by providing purpose-built infrastructure for distributed training at scale
2024	March 4	Product (AI)	Anthropic's Claude 3 Sonnet foundation model is now available in Amazon Bedrock
2024	April 23	Product (AI)	Amazon makes model evaluation capability for Amazon Bedrock generally available.
2024	April 23	Product (AI)	Guardrails for Amazon Bedrock now available with new safety filters and privacy controls.
2024	April 23	Product (AI)	Custom Model Import for Bedrock
2024	April 30	Product (AI)	Amazon Q Business now GA and Amazon Q Apps in Preview
2024	May 7	Product (AI)	Amazon Bedrock Studio, a web interface providing the easiest way for developers across an organization to collaborate and build generative AI applications
2024	May 7	Product (AI)	Amazon Titan Text Premier is a high-performance and cost-effective large language model engineered for enterprise-grade text generation applications, including optimized performance for retrieval-augmented generation (RAG) and Agents
2024	June 19	Product (AI)	Amazon SageMaker now offers a fully managed MLflow capability
2024	June 20	Product (AI)	Anthropic's Claude 3.5 Sonnet foundation model, which is its most intelligent model to date, is now generally available in Amazon Bedrock.
2024	December 03	Product (AI)	Amazon EC2 Trn2 Instances and Trn2 UltraServers for AI/ML training and inference are now available
2025	January	Product (AI)	DeepSeek-R1 models now available on Amazon Bedrock and Amazon SageMaker AI
2025	March	Product (AI)	DeepSeek-R1 is available fully-managed in Amazon Bedrock

== Partnerships ==
Year	Month and date (if available)	Event type	Details
2007	June 1	Partnerships	Dropbox is founded. Dropbox, a storage and backup service aimed at ordinary consumers and businesses, would grow into one of the biggest users of Amazon S3.
2008	August	Partnerships	Netflix announces it will start moving all its data to the Amazon Web Services cloud. It finally shifts all its data to the cloud by January 2016.
2009	June 15	Partnerships	Zynga announces that it will move its data to AWS.
2009	November	Partnerships	reddit announces that it has finished decommissioning its physical servers and moves its data to AWS.
2010	March	Partnerships	Pinterest launches the first prototype of its product. Pinterest would grow into one of AWS's most famous customers and a case study in how a startup can grow extremely quickly by relying on the cloud.
2011	June	Partnerships	Zynga CEO Allan Leinwand announces that Zynga will shift its data from AWS to its own zCloud. It moves from 20% to 80% of its data being stored on the zCloud from the beginning to the end of 2011.
2011	August 16	Partnerships	AWS launches AWS GovCloud, a US region designed to meet the regulatory requirements of the United States government, and intended for use by United States government agencies.
2014	January	Partnerships	Moz announces its decision to move off AWS, citing expenses.
2014	August 25	Partnerships	Amazon.com acquires Twitch Interactive for US$970 million. The ability to store Twitch data on AWS is specifically cited as one of the major reasons why Twitch decided to go under Amazon.
2015	May 8	Partnerships	Zynga announces that it will move all its data back to AWS, after diversifying away from AWS in 2011.
2016	February	Partnerships, Competition	Spotify announces it will move its data to Google Cloud.
2016	May 25	Partnerships	Salesforce.com, a cloud computing company that makes money primarily through its customer relationship management product suite, selects Amazon Web Services as its preferred public cloud infrastructure provider. However, Salesforce.com does not plan to move entirely to Amazon, but rather use Amazon only to meet infrastructure expansion needs in new geographical areas and for specific use cases. On December 2, 2016, the partnership is extended and it is announced that Salesforce will use AWS infrastructure in Canada.
2017	April	Partnerships	DXC Technology announces it will increase integration with AWS for its enterprise clients.
2020	May	Partnerships	Kyvos announces availability on AWS.
2023	February 7	Partnerships	Ateme completes ISV Accelerate Program, ISW Workload Migration and is available on AWS Marketplace. This indicates that Ateme's solutions meet AWS standards and further support its global partnership with AWS.
2023	September 25	Partnerships	Amazon and Anthropic selects AWS as its primary cloud provider and will train and deploy its future foundation models on AWS Trainium and Inferentia chips, taking advantage of AWS's high-performance, low-cost machine learning accelerators.
2024	May 6	Partnerships	AWS signes a strategic collaboration agreement with Mavenir resulting in jointly architecting Mavenir's technology of cloud-native Telco solutions to transform how operators launch 5G, IP Multimedia Subsystem, Radio Access Network and future network technologies.

== Outages ==
Year	Month and date (if available)	Event type	Details
2011	April 21	Outage	At 12:47 am PDT on April 21, an invalid traffic shift prior to network upgrade caused EBS instances to lose connectivity to one another with an availability zone of us-east-1 region. Once the errors were localized to just one availability zone, the EBS recovery These connectivity errors impacted EBS volume and EC2 instances in multiple availability zones and caused issues for customers until full recovery at 3:00 pm PDT on April 24.
2011	August 7	Outage	Power lost in Ireland, EU West region, causing disruption and outage "service disruption began at 10:41 AM PDT on August 7th" (also mentioned but distinct from the outage mentioned above; it happened around the same time as the US outage). Due to followup issues, full restoration of e g EBS and RDS took in the order of days.
2011	August 8	Outage	EC2 went down around 10:25 p.m. Eastern in Amazon's us-east-1 Region. The cloud outage lasted roughly 30 minutes, but took down the Web sites and services of many major Amazon cloud customers, including Netflix, Reddit and Foursquare. The issue happened in the networks that connect the Availability Zones to the Internet and was primarily caused by a software bug in the router.
2012	June 29	Service disruption	A major disruption occurs to the EC2, EBS, and RDS services in a single availability zone (due to a large scale electrical storm which swept through the Northern Virginia area).
2012	October 22	Outage	A major outage occurs (due to latent memory leak bug in an operational data collection agent), affecting many sites such as Reddit, Foursquare, Pinterest, and others.
2012	December 24	Outage	AWS suffers an outage, causing websites such as Netflix instant video to be unavailable for customers in the Northeastern United States.
2013	September 13	Outage	AWS us-east-1 region experienced network connectivity issues affecting instances in a single Availability Zone. We also experienced increased error rates and latencies for the EBS APIs and increased error rates for EBS-backed instance launches.
2014	November 26	Service disruption	Amazon CloudFront DNS server went down for two hours, starting at 7:15 p.m. EST. The DNS server was back up just after 9 p.m. Some websites and cloud services were knocked offline as the content delivery network failed to fulfill DNS requests during the outage. Nothing major, but worthy of this list because it involved the world's biggest and longest-running cloud.
2015	September 20	Outage	The Amazon DynamoDB service experiences an outage in an availability zone in the us-east-1 (North Virginia) region, due to a power outage and inadequate failover procedures. The outage, which occurs on a Sunday morning, lasts for about five hours (with some residual impact till Monday) and affects a number of related Amazon services include Simple Queue Service, EC2 autoscaling, Amazon CloudWatch, and the online AWS console. A number of customers are negatively affected, including Netflix, but Netflix is able to recover quickly because of its strong disaster recovery procedures.
2016	June 5	Outage	AWS Sydney experiences an outage for several hours as a result of severe thunderstorms in the region causing a power outage to the data centers.
2017	February 28	Outage	Amazon experiences an outage of S3 in us-east-1. There are also related outages for other services in us-east-1 including CloudFormation, autoscaling, Elastic MapReduce, Simple Email Service, and Simple Workflow Service. A number of websites and services using S3, such as Medium, Slack, Imgur and Trello, are affected. AWS's own status dashboard initially fails to reflect the change properly due to a dependency on S3. On March 2, AWS reveals that the outage was caused by an incorrect parameter passed in by an authorized employee while running an established playbook, that ended up deleting more instances than the employee intended.
2018	March 2	Service degradation	Starting 6:25 AM PST, Direct Connect experienced connectivity issues related to a power outage issue in their us-east-1 Region. This caused customers to have service interruptions in reaching their EC2 instances. Issue was resolved fully by 10:26 AM PST.
2018	May 31	Outage	Beginning at 2:52 pm PDT a small percentage of EC2 servers lost power in a single Availability Zone in the us-east-1 Region. This resulted in some impaired EC2 instances and degraded performance for some EBS volumes in the affected Availability Zone. Power was restored at 3:22 pm PDT.
2019	August 23	Outage	A number of EC2 servers in the Tokyo region shut down due to overheating at 12:36 pm local time, due to a failure in the datacenter control and cooling system.
2019	August 31	Outage and data loss	A us-east-1 data center suffered a power failure at 4:33 am local time, and the backup generators failed at 6 am. According to AWS, this affected 7.5 percent of the EC2 instances in one of the ten data centers in one of the six Availability Zones in us-east-1. However, after restoring power, a number of EBS volumes, which store the filesystems of the EC2 cloud servers, were permanently unrecoverable. This caused downtime for companies such as Reddit.
2019	October 22–23	Service degradation from DDoS	AWS sustained a distributed denial of service attack which caused intermittent DNS resolution errors (for their Route 53 DNS service) from 10:30 am PST to 6:30 pm PST.
2020	November 25	Outage	Beginning at 9:52 am PST the Kinesis Data Streams API became impaired in the us-east-1 Region. This prevented customers from reading or writing data.
2021	December 7	Outage	Beginning at 10:45 am PST "an impairment of several network devices" in the us-east-1 Region caused widespread errors in all AWS services. The root cause has been mitigated by 4:35 PM PST, but service recovery was still underway causing localized ongoing impairment.
2021	December 15	Outage	Region us-west-1 was unavailable for about 30 minutes.
2021	December 22	Outage and potential data loss	Power loss in us-east-1 for about 1 hour, followed by extended recovery procedures. AWS attributed the failure to a single availability zone, USE1-AZ4.
2023	June 13	Outage	Beginning at 11:49 am PDT, customers experienced increased error rates and latencies for AWS Lambda function invocations within the Northern Virginia (us-east-1) Region. By 3:37 pm PDT, the AWS Lambda service and all dependent service resumed normal operations.
2025	October 20	Outage	Beginning at 12:11 am PDT, customers experienced increased error rates and latencies for multiple AWS services within the Northern Virginia (us-east-1) Region. A number of websites and services such as Roblox, Fortnite, Snapchat, and Duolingo were affected. The outage was caused by a bug in the DynamoDB DNS management system.

== See also ==
- List of Amazon products and services
- History of Amazon
