= List of orchestration software =

This is a list of different orchestration software.

== List ==
- ADARA Networks
- Ansible
- BMC Software
- CFEngine
- Cloud-init
- Cloudify
- CloudVelox
- Conductor
- DynamicOps
- FOG Project
- Kubernetes
- ManageIQ
- OpenSAF
- OpenTofu
- Progress Chef
- Puppet
- Rex
- Salt
- Serf
- StackStorm
- Terraform
- TotalAgility
- Veeam Availability Orchestrator

== See also ==
- Continuous configuration automation
- Infrastructure as code
