= List of formerly open-source or free software =

This is a list of notable software packages which were published as free and open-source software, or into the public domain, but were made proprietary software, or otherwise switched to a license (including source-available licenses) that is not considered to be free and open source.

List of formerly open-source software
Title	Orig. free date	License change date	Initial free license	Non-free license	Forked replacement	Notes
Akka	2009	2022	Apache-2.0	Business Source License		
ArangoDB	2011	2023	Apache-2.0	Business Source License		
Aseprite	2001	2016	GPL-2.0	EULA that permits personal use but forbids redistribution	LibreSprite	
CockroachDB	2015	2019	Apache-2.0	Business Source License		
Consul	2014	2023	MPL-2.0	Business Source License		
Couchbase Server	2010	2021	Apache-2.0	Business Source License		
Couchbase Mobile		2022	Apache-2.0	Business Source License		
Elasticsearch	2010	2021	Apache-2.0	"Elastic License" and Server Side Public License	OpenSearch	Added AGPL v3.0 on 29 August 2024
Emby	2014	2018	GPL-2.0	Source code closed on 8 December 2018.	Jellyfin	
FBReader	2013	2015	GPL-2.0-or-later	Apparently the number of devs was limited, and they all agreed to relicense it.		
GeoGebra	2001	2013	GPL-3.0	GeoGebra License; non-commercial freeware		
LiveCode	2013	2021	GPL-3.0-only	proprietary		The Livecode company developed it, ran a Kickstarter campaign to GPL it, ran it for eight years open source, and then relicensed it back to proprietary, saying there were few other contributors, most were using the free GPL version, and they couldn't sustain the project.
LiveJournal	1999	2014	GPL-2.0-or-later	The source code was made private in 2014.	Dreamwidth	
MetaMask	2016	2020	MIT	Custom proprietary "non-commercial use only" license.		
MongoDB	2009	2018	AGPL-3.0-only	Server Side Public License		
Nexuiz	2005	2012	GPL-2.0-or-later	Game abandoned in favour of a commercial video game of the same name, which licensed the Nexuiz title but is not based on its engine.	Xonotic	
OctoberCMS	2014	2021	MIT	Cited the sustainability of its open source model as a factor.	Winter	
OTRS	2001	2020	GPL-3.0-or-later	Support for the Community Edition dropped on 23 December 2020,	Znuny	
Paint.NET	2004	2007	MIT	freeware license that prohibits modification or resale		
PyMOL	2000	2010	MIT-CMU (Note: now a custom license granting broad use, redistribution, and modification rights, but assigning copyright to any version to Schrodinger, LLC.)			
Reddit	2008	2017	CPAL-1.0	Source code was made private in 2017, as the internal codebase had already diverged significantly from the public one.		
Redis	2009	2024	BSD-3-Clause	dual: custom license and Server Side Public License	Valkey	Added AGPL v3.0 on 1 May 2025. Vadim Tkachenko (co-founder of Percona) doesn't expect this move to affect Valkey, as the de facto purpose of the AGPL "appears to be creating barriers for public cloud providers, which likely guarantees that major sponsors like Amazon and Google will continue to support Valkey."
Sourcegraph	2013	2023	Apache-2.0	proprietary		
Terraform	2014	2023	MPL-2.0	Business Source License	OpenTofu	HashiCorp CEO considered the OpenTofu fork "tragic for open source innovation."
Tux Racer	2000	2002	GPL-2.0-or-later	Commercial expansion by original authors, also called Tux Racer.	Extreme Tux Racer (formerly PlanetPenguin Racer)	
Vagrant	2010	2023	MIT	Business Source License		

== See also ==
- List of formerly proprietary software
