= Anima Anandkumar =

Researcher and Professor of computing

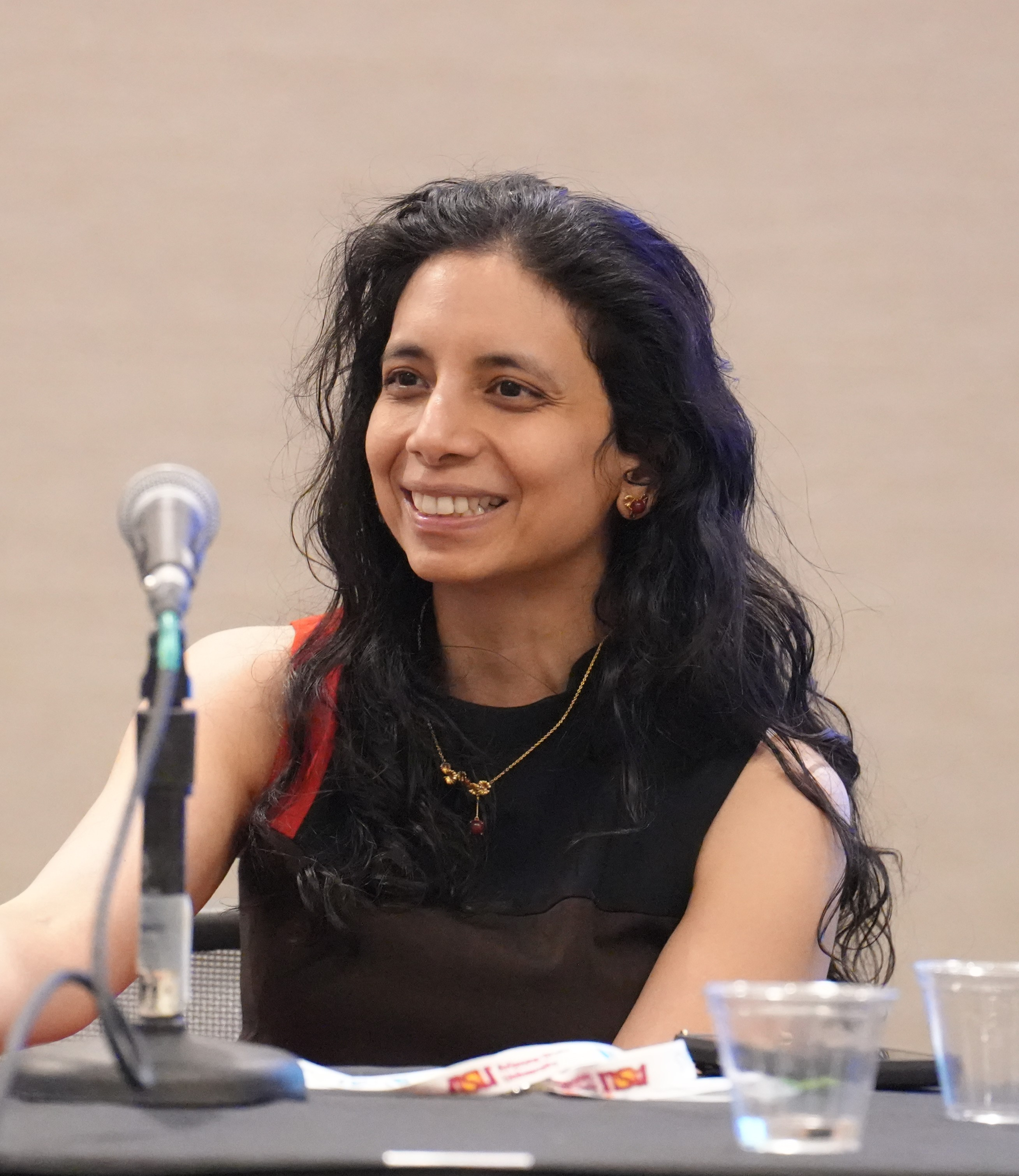
- Dr. Anandkumar speaking at AAAS 2026
- Born: Mysore, Karnataka, India
- Education: Indian Institute of Technology Madras (BS); Cornell University (MS, PhD)
- Scientific career
- Workplaces: University of California Irvine; California Institute of Technology
- Thesis: Scalable Algorithms for Distributed Statistical Inference (2009)
- Doctoral advisor: Lang Tong

Animashree (Anima) Anandkumar is the Bren Professor of Computing at California Institute of Technology. She is also the co-founder of Accelerated Understanding. Previously, she was a senior director of Machine Learning research at NVIDIA and a principal scientist at Amazon Web Services. Her research considers tensor-algebraic methods, deep learning and non-convex problems.

== Education and early career ==
Anandkumar was born in Mysore. Her parents are both engineers, and her grandfather was a mathematician. Her great-great-grandfather was the Sanskrit scholar R. Shamasastry. She began to study Bharatanatyam and she learnt this style of dancing for many years. She studied electrical engineering at the Indian Institute of Technology Madras and graduated in 2004. She attended Cornell University for her graduate studies, earning a PhD under the supervision of Lang Tong in 2009. Her first project looked at distributed statistical estimation. She was an IBM Fellow at Cornell University between 2008 and 2009. Her thesis considered Scalable Algorithms for Distributed Statistical Inference. During her PhD she worked in the networking group at IBM on end-to-end service-level transactions. She was a postdoctoral scholar at Massachusetts Institute of Technology until 2010, where she worked in the Stochastic Systems Group with Alan Willsky.

== Research ==
In 2010, Anandkumar joined University of California, Irvine, as an assistant professor. At the time, the technology industry was at the beginning of the big data revolution. Here she started working on tensor decompositions of latent variable models. She joined Microsoft Research in New England as a visiting scientist in 2012. In 2013 she was awarded a National Science Foundation CAREER Award to investigate big data and social networks. She was made an associate professor with tenure at UC Irvine in 2016. She specialised in large-scale machine learning and high-dimensional statistics. Anandkumar was a principal scientist at Amazon Web Services from 2016 to 2018. She worked with the Apache MXNet tool, introducing new functionality and developing multi-modal processing algorithms. She represented Amazon Web Services at the Anita Borg Institute in 2017, and in 2018, both the Mulan forum for Chinese women entrepreneurs and Shaastra, where she discussed Deep Learning. She also worked on Amazon Rekognition, Amazon Lex and Amazon Polly. She was involved in the launch of Amazon SageMaker, an opportunity for developers to use machine learning models. Anandkumar joined the Machine Learning Conference Board of Advisors in 2018. In 2018, Anandkumar joined NVIDIA as director of Machine Learning Research, and Caltech as the Bren Professor of Computing and Mathematical Sciences. At NVIDIA she opened a new core laboratory in artificial intelligence and machine learning in Santa Clara. She has pushed for governments to invest in robotics and artificial intelligence. She spoke at the 2018 TEDxIndianaUniversity event "From Ashes We Rise" about the algorithms she has developed to process big data.

Anima Anandkumar has also developed AI algorithms that work with applications in various scientific domains including weather forecasting, drug discovery, scientific simulations and engineering design. She invented Neural Operators that extend deep learning to modeling multi-scale processes in these scientific domains, learn in function spaces, and are orders of magnitude faster than traditional simulations. She has developed AI-based high-resolution weather models, an AI-aided method for designing anti-infection medical catheters. Neural operators were a featured highlight for 2021 in Math and Computer Science as printed in Quanta Magazine, and genome-scale foundation models with emergent behavior in predicting evolutionary dynamics and protein function in several diverse tasks and scenarios, which won the Association for Computing Machinery (ACM) Gordon Bell Special Prize for High Performance Computing-Based COVID-19 Research in 2022.

Anandkumar has also done some of the early work on generalist AI agents using language models, which are capable of simulating a life cycle in their learning using foundation models in an interactive manner. In particular, her work has shown how interactive in-context learning in language models can be used to construct actions in the form of program code to solve complex open-ended tasks in environments such as Minecraft and robotic reinforcement learning.

While at Caltech, Anandkumar co-founded the AI for Science initiative in 2018. In 2023, she was invited by the Presidential Council of Advisors on Science and Technology (PCAST) on AI+Science. In addition, she has given keynotes at the Annual Meeting of the US National Committee for Theoretical and Applied Mechanics, the UCLA distinguished seminar, the SIAM annual meeting, the Nature Reviews Physics, hosted by the Alan Turing Institute, the TED2024 conference, and the SC26 conference.

== Campaigns ==
Anandkumar launched a petition to Timothy A. Gonsalves to try and convince the Ministry of Human Resource Development to end gender segregation in the admissions process at the Indian Institute of Technology Madras. The petition calls for campus-wide systems to monitor sexual harassment, improved campus security and increased engagement with alumni. She has spoken openly about her own experiences of sexual harassment and called for Intel to stop using female acrobats as entertainment at their conference parties. She was one of several campaigners to rename the Conference on Neural Information Processing Systems 'NIPS' as NeurIPS. In 2018, she was awarded a New York Times Good Tech Award.

== Awards and honors ==
Anandkumar has won several awards and honours, including:

- 2026 Time100 AI Innovator
- 2025 Time100 Impact Award "for using AI to accelerate scientific discovery"
- 2025 IEEE Kiyo Tomiyasu Award "for contributions to AI, including tensor methods and neural operators with applications to scientific domains"
- 2024 Blavatnik Award for Young Scientists for "groundbreaking advancements in AI to address practical scientific challenges, drastically accelerating simulation of complex phenomena like weather forecasting, scientific simulations, engineering design and scientific discovery"
- 2024 TED Speaker on "AI that connects the digital and physical worlds"
- 2024 Distinguished Alumnus Award by IIT Madras for "her achievements and contributions towards interdisciplinary scientific innovation"
- 2023 Guggenheim Fellow in the field of computer science
- 2023 Schmidt Sciences AI 2050 Senior Fellow that supports established leaders who have made significant contributions to their field
- 2023 AAAI Fellow for "significant contributions to machine learning including neural operators for scientific machine learning and tensor methods for probabilistic models"
- 2022 ACM Fellow for "contributions to tensor methods for probabilistic models and neural operators"
- 2022 Outstanding Paper at Neural Information Processing
- 2022 ACM Gordon-Bell Special Prize for HPC for COVID-19 Research
- 2021 IEEE Fellow for "contributions to theory and applications in signal processing, machine learning, and artificial intelligence"
- 2017 Caltech Bren Endowed Chair
- 2015 Air Force Office of Scientific Research Young Investigator Award
- 2014 Sloan Research Fellowship
- 2013 Microsoft Faculty Fellowship
- 2013 National Science Foundation CAREER Award
- 2011 ACM SIGMETRICS Best Paper Award
- 2008 IEEE Signal Processing Society Young Author Best Paper Award
- 2008-09 Fran Allen IBM PhD Fellowship
