= Orchestration (disambiguation) =

Orchestration is the study or practice of writing music for an orchestra.

It may also refer to:

- Orchestration (computing), management of computing resources
- Orchestration (games), management of a pervasive game
