= Hubtel =

Ghanaian Financial Service Company

- Company type: Private
- Industry: Financial services; Payment processor
- Founded: 2005; 21 years ago
- Founders: Alex Bram, Ernest Apenteng and Leslie Gyimah
- Headquarters: Accra, Ghana,
- Services: Payments; E-Commerce; Bulk Messaging
- Website: hubtel.com

Hubtel is a Ghanaian financial technology and e-commerce company headquartered in Accra, Ghana. The company provides mobile financial services, including digital payments, e-commerce solutions, and bulk messaging for businesses and consumers.

== History ==
Hubtel was founded in 2005 as SMSGH, initially offering bulk SMS services to businesses in Ghana. Over time, the company expanded into mobile financial services, eventually rebranding as Hubtel in 2017 to reflect its broader digital payments and e-commerce focus In 2022, Hubtel received approval from the Bank of Ghana to operate as a Payment Services Provider in Ghana.

== Services ==
=== Payment Processing ===
Hubtel provides digital payment solutions that enable businesses to accept mobile money, bank card transactions, and QR payments. The company's platform integrates with major Ghanaian banks and mobile network operators to facilitate these transactions.

=== E-Commerce ===
Hubtel operates an online marketplace that allows businesses to list and sell products while offering delivery services in partnership with logistics providers. The platform serves as a hub for grocery shopping, food delivery, and general retail services.

=== Bulk Messaging ===
The company continues to offer bulk SMS and messaging services to businesses, government institutions, and organizations for marketing and communication purposes.

== Hubtel-ECG Controversy ==
In 2023, Hubtel became involved in a controversy regarding its partnership with the Electricity Company of Ghana (ECG) to modernize the utility company's payment systems. Hubtel was contracted to develop and manage the ECG PowerApp, a mobile application aimed at improving customer payments and revenue collection. However, the partnership was met with financial disputes and public scrutiny.

A major point of contention arose when Hubtel submitted an invoice to ECG amounting to GH¢259,819,544.97. ECG's management challenged the validity of this claim, arguing that several billed items were outside the agreed contractual terms. After negotiations, the final payment was reduced to GH¢20 million.

Further controversy emerged over claims that Hubtel had received $25 million for the development of the PowerApp. The company denied this, stating that the $25 million figure was a cost ceiling approved by ECG's board and that actual expenditures amounted to $12 million. Hubtel also addressed concerns about its revenue-sharing agreement with ECG, clarifying that it receives a 0.95% commission from payments processed through its platform, contrary to reports suggesting a 3% fee.

The Africa Center for Energy Policy (ACEP) raised concerns about financial discrepancies and called for an independent audit of all payments made to Hubtel under the contract. ACEP cited inconsistencies between figures reported by Hubtel and those found in ECG's financial records.

== Awards and recognition ==
In 2019, Hubtel was awarded the Emerging E-commerce Initiative and Fintech Company of the Year awards at the 9th Ghana Information Technology & Telecom Awards (GITTA) ceremony held on June 28. The following year, at the FIN Cashless Awards in 2020, Hubtel was named "Digital Company of the Year

In 2022, Hubtel achieved recognition at the Ghana Fintech Awards, emerging as the most awarded company by securing five accolades: Fintech Company of the Year, IT/Tech Firm of the Year, Fintech Platform of the Year, UI/UX Fintech Company of the Year, and Leading Payments Technologies Service Provider of the Yea.
