= Lightsail =

The term lightsail may reference:

- a solar sail for spacecraft propulsion
- LightSail, a solar sail cubesat by The Planetary Society
- Amazon Lightsail, a computing server service
