= StackStorm =

- Other names: ST2
- Release: 3 November 2014; 11 years ago
- Stable release: 3.9.0 / 10 October 2025; 10 months ago
- Written in: Python
- Operating system: Linux, Unix-like
- Available in: English
- Type: Configuration management and Infrastructure as Code
- License: Apache 2.0
- Website: stackstorm.com
- Repository: github.com/StackStorm

StackStorm (ST2) is an open source event-driven platform for runbook automation. It supports the infrastructure as code (IaC) approach to DevOps automation and has been compared with SaltStack and Ansible, it primarily focuses on doing things or running workflows based on events. StackStorm is comparable to IFTTT or Zapier in providing a way to connect many different services together in coherent applets or workflows that begin based on defined events or triggers.

While Stackstorm has been used to automate workflows in many industries, a particularly interesting application is the Arteria project that provides components to automate analysis and data-management tasks at next-generation sequencing core-facilities. It leverages a micro-service based architecture together with StackStorm to create an event-driven automation system.

== History ==
StackStorm was founded by Evan Powell and Dmitri Zimine. With initial funding by XSeed Capital, StackStorm came out of stealth on May 6, 2014 to introduce a private beta program for the company's first product. StackStorm offered IT departments the capability to automatically trigger actions and drive behaviors across the infrastructure and separate systems with scriptable processes. While StackStorm platform was initially focused on the general DevOps automation, it extended to networking after the company was acquired by Brocade in 2016. In 2017 StackStorm transitioned to Extreme Networks as part of Brocade's data center networking business acquisition. Supported by Extreme Networks, StackStorm continued to be an OpenSource project. Brocade, and then Extreme Networks, offered a commercial product built on top of the StackStorm platform named Brocade Workflow Composer and then Extreme Workflow Composer.

In 2019, Extreme Networks facilitated moving the StackStorm project to the Linux Foundation citing community requests for more neutral governance. In 2020, Extreme Networks also donated their Extreme Workflow Composer to the Linux Foundation, thus allowing the StackStorm community to integrate its features in the core StackStorm product.
