= Pulumi =

Software company

Pulumi Corp.
- Company type: Privately held company
- Genre: Infrastructure as code
- Founded: 2017
- Headquarters: Seattle, WA, United States
- Key people: Joe Duffy; Eric Rudder; Luke Hoban
- Website: www.pulumi.com

Pulumi Corporation is a software company based in Seattle, Washington. Pulumi develops an open-source infrastructure-as-code software.

Pulumi
- Developer: Pulumi Corporation
- Stable release: 3.245.0 / June 4, 2026; 12 days ago
- Operating system: Microsoft Windows, macOS, Linux,
- Type: Infrastructure as code
- License: Apache

== History ==
Pulumi was founded in 2017 by former Microsoft employees Joe Duffy and Eric Rudder.

== Software ==
The open-source Pulumi CLI and SDKs allows users to manage cloud infrastructure resources in Cloud Providers such as AWS, Azure, Google Cloud, and Kubernetes. using programming languages such as Go, JavaScript, TypeScript, Python, Java, C# and YAML.

Pulumi's Automation API supports provisioning infrastructure via programmatic workflows.

== Criticism ==
In May 2024 The Register reported that Pulumi AI-generated code examples indexed by Google's search engine contain many cases that are untested and/or buggy.

== See also ==
- Terraform
