= Bulk messaging =

Dissemination of large numbers of SMS messages

Bulk messaging is the dissemination of large numbers of SMS messages for delivery to mobile phone terminals. It is used by media companies, banks and other enterprises (for marketing and fraud control) and consumer brands for a variety of purposes including entertainment, enterprise and mobile marketing.

Bulk messaging is commonly used for alerts, reminders and marketing, but also information and communication between both staff and customers.

== Software ==
Software is required for sending and receiving bulk SMS, and various software packages are available. These software packages provide users with the opportunity to add as many phone numbers as required and these phone numbers can be managed in a variety of ways. Most SMS software applications allow the upload of lists of mobile phone numbers using a text file or CSV file. Some sophisticated systems can automatically remove any duplicated or improper numbers, and the mobile numbers may be validated before sending the messages. With enhanced software features, messages can be scheduled to be sent at specific times and/or days and bulk messages can be sent on national and international mobile networks as long as the bulk messaging software provider sends internationally.

== API ==
Most bulk messaging services use the following standard application programming interfaces (APIs) which allow programmers to add SMS functionality to any program:

- SMTP (Simple Mail Transfer Protocol for Email)
- REST (Representational State Transfer Protocol)
- FTP (File Transfer Protocol)
- HTTP (Hypertext Transfer Protocol)
- SMPP (Short Message Peer-to-Peer)

== See also ==
- Amazon SNS (Simple Notification Service)
