= Conductor (software) =

Microservice orchestration software

- Developers: Netflix Team (Originally) Orkes & Open Source contributors (Current)
- Release: December 8, 2016; 9 years ago
- Stable release: 3.32.4 / September 10, 2026; 13 days ago
- Written in: Java, JavaScript (UI), Python, Go
- Platform: Linux
- License: Apache License 2.0
- Website: www.conductor-oss.org
- Repository: github.com/conductor-oss/conductor

Conductor is a free and open-source microservice and workflow orchestration software platform originally developed by Netflix.

Conductor was created at Netflix to solve problems of orchestrating microservices and business processes at scale in cloud-native environments. It was released under the Apache License 2.0 and has been adopted by thousands of organizations globally for orchestrating microservices, business processes, AI agent workflows, and event-driven architectures.

Since December 2023, the open-source project has been maintained by Orkes and the Conductor OSS community after Conductor transitioned to independent community governance, following a pattern common among major Netflix open-source projects.

Conductor belongs to a set of software products that allows developers to build resilient, high-scale, cloud-native stateful applications using stateless primitives.

== Architecture ==
Conductor server is written in Java with APIs exposed over HTTP and gRPC interfaces making it possible to do language agnostic development. A set of client libraries are made available by Netflix and community in Java, Python and Go.

Conductor uses a lightweight JSON based schema with rich programming language constructs such as fork/join, switch case, loops and exception handling to define the flows.

At the heart of Conductor is a queuing system that is used to schedule tasks and manage the process flows. Conductor leverages a pluggable model allowing different implementations of the queuing system. Open source version uses Dyno-Queues developed at Netflix for queuing as default implementation.

The workflows are defined as the orchestration among the tasks which can be a system level construct such as fork, join, switch, loop, an external HTTP endpoint implementing business logic or a task worker running outside of Conductor servers and listening for work to be scheduled by the server. The workers communicate with the server using pre-defined APIs over HTTP or gRPC. Conductor provides lightweight libraries to manage worker states in Java, Python and Go and additional languages can be used to implement logic using provided APIs.

Conductor uses pluggable architecture model allowing for different databases to store its states. The current version has support for Redis (Stand-alone, Sentinel, Cluster and Dynomite), Postgres, Mysql, Cassandra and uses Elasticsearch as indexing mechanism.

The UI is written in ReactJS and provides ability to search, visualize and manage the workflow states.

The Conductor server exposes APIs over HTTP and gRPC interfaces, enabling language-agnostic development. Workers are stateless processes that communicate with the Conductor server to poll for and execute tasks. Conductor uses a pluggable architecture allowing different database backends for state storage, including Redis, PostgreSQL, MySQL, and Apache Cassandra, with Elasticsearch used for indexing and search.

== Cloud Hosted Services ==
Orkes - was founded by the creators of Netflix Conductor and provides cloud managed offering of Netflix Conductor in various clouds and in data center.
