= Shift-left testing =

Type of software testing

Shift-left testing is an approach to software testing and system testing in which testing is performed earlier in the lifecycle (i.e. moved left on the project timeline). It is the first half of the maxim "test early and often". It was coined by Larry Smith in 2001.

== Harm because of late testing ==
Shift-left testing aims to prevent the following types of harm caused by late testing:

- Insufficient resources allocated to testing.
- Undiscovered defects in requirements, architecture, and design, along with significant effort wasted while implementing them.
- Difficulty debugging (including identifying, localizing, fixing, and regression testing defects) as more software is produced and integrated.
- Reduced code coverage during testing as a result of encapsulation impeding white-box testing.
- A “bow wave” of technical debt that can cause a project to fail.

== Types of shift-left testing ==
There are four basic ways to shift testing earlier in the life-cycle (that is, leftward on the classic V-model). These can be referred to as traditional shift-left testing, incremental shift-left testing, Agile/DevOps shift-left testing, and model-based shift-left testing.

=== Traditional shift-left testing ===
As illustrated in the following figure, traditional shift-left moves the emphasis of testing lower down (and therefore slightly to the left) on the right hand side of the classic V model. Instead of emphasizing acceptance and system level testing (e.g., GUI testing with record and playback tools), traditional shift-left concentrates on unit testing and integration testing (e.g., using API testing and modern test tools).

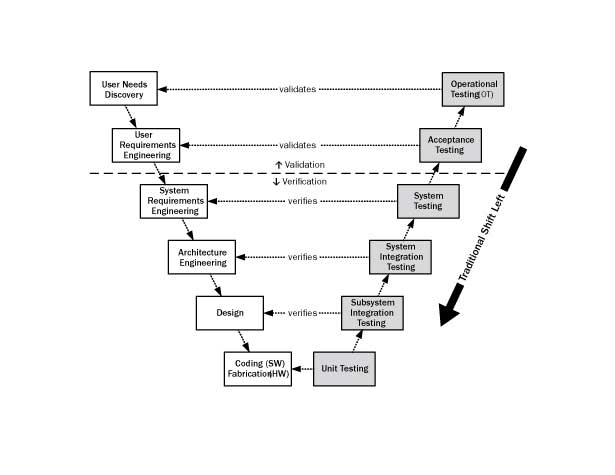
Traditional shift-left testing

=== Incremental shift-left testing ===
As illustrated in the following figure, many projects developing large and complex software-reliant systems decompose development into a small number of increments (Vs) having correspondingly shorter durations. The shift-left illustrated by the dashed red arrows occurs because parts of the single, large waterfall V model’s types of testing (shown in gray) are shifted left to become increments of the corresponding types of testing in the smaller incremental V models. When each increment is also a delivery to the customer and operations, then incremental shift-left testing shifts both developmental testing and operational testing to the left. Incremental shift-left testing is popular when developing large, complex systems, especially those incorporating significant amounts of hardware.

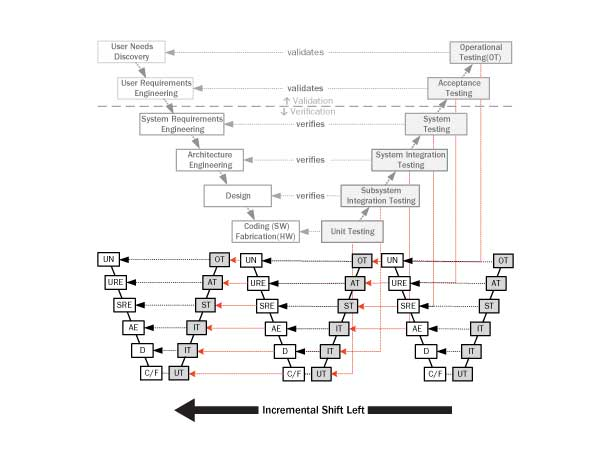
Incremental shift-left testing

=== Agile/DevOps shift-left testing ===
As illustrated in the following figure, Agile and DevOps projects have numerous short duration Vs (sprints) in lieu of a single or small number of V as in the previous two examples of shift-left testing. These small Vs would also be modified if one or more early sprints are used to block out the basic requirements and architecture or if test-first and test-driven development (TDD) are being performed. The shift-left occurs because the types of testing on the right sides of the earliest of these tiny Vs are to the left of the corresponding types of testing on right side of the larger V(s) they replace. While the following figure appears remarkably the same for Agile and DevOps, Agile testing is typically restricted to developmental testing and does not include operational testing, which occurs once the system is placed into operation.

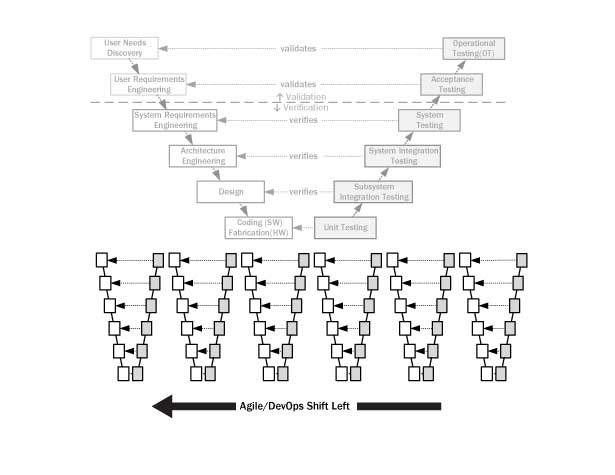
Agile/DevOps shift-left testing

=== Model-based shift-left testing ===
The previous forms all concentrated on testing earlier in the development cycle. However, they all test after software exists and seek to uncover only implementation defects.

Model-based testing moves testing to the left side of the Vs, by testing requirements, architecture, and design models. This shift begins testing almost immediately, instead of waiting a long time (traditional testing), medium time (incremental testing), or short time (Agile/DevOps) for software to become available to the right side of the Vs.

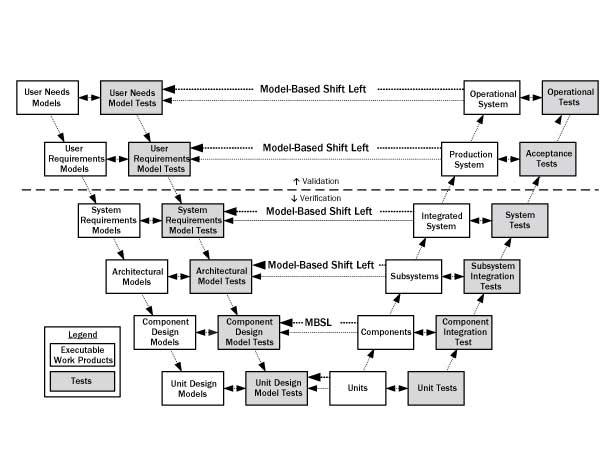
Model-based shift-left testing
