= Topper Shutt =

American television meteorologist

- Born: Charles Shutt
- Occupation: Television Meteorologist
- Notable credit: WUSA-TV Chief Meteorologist
- Children: 3 daughters
- Website: http://www.wusa9.com/news/columnist/blogs/toppershutt.html Topper's Blog

Charles "Topper" Shutt is Chief Meteorologist at WUSA Channel 9 in Washington, D.C., and forecaster for WHUR-FM.

== Career ==
In 1981, Shutt began his television weather career with CNN in Atlanta, Georgia, working as a weather producer and substitute weather anchor. In 1984, he moved on to a weekday weather anchor position at WTVK-TV (now WVLT-TV) in Knoxville, Tennessee. He spent a year, from 1987 to 1988, as weekend weather anchor at WFMY-TV in Greensboro, North Carolina. In 1988, he joined WFMY sister station WUSA, also at that time beginning to supply to forecasts to WHUR-FM. In 1992, he co-founded Automated Weather Source, a network of weather stations that reported real-time observations to be used on broadcast television. Between 1994 and 2000 he served as occasional stand-in for CBS This Morning weather anchors Mark McEwen and Craig Allen.

Shutt also served on the National Science Foundation review panel for the National Science Education Standards.

== Biography ==
Topper Shutt was a childhood resident of the Washington area, Shutt graduated from Landon School in Bethesda, Maryland before attending Trinity College in Hartford, Connecticut with a major in history. He went on to the University of Tennessee and the University of North Carolina at Asheville to study Meteorology.

He is married with three daughters and lives in Potomac, Maryland.

== Sources ==
- "Topper Shutt Bio". WUSA.
