= Aseprite =

Pixel art image and animation editor

- Aseprite screenshot
- Developer: Igara Studio S.A.
- Release: 2001; 25 years ago
- Stable release: v1.3.17 / February 25, 2026; 8 months ago
- Written in: C++, Lua
- Operating system: Microsoft Windows, MacOS and Linux
- Type: Raster graphics editor
- License: EULA, educational and Steam license
- Website: www.aseprite.org
- Repository: github.com/aseprite/aseprite

Aseprite (/ˈeɪspraɪt/ ace-prite) is a proprietary, source-available image editor designed primarily for pixel art drawing and animation. It runs on Windows, macOS, and Linux, and features different tools for image and animation editing such as layers, frames, tilemap support, command-line interface, Lua scripting, among others. It is developed by Igara Studio S.A. and led by the developers David, Gaspar, and Martín Capello. Aseprite can be downloaded as freeware, (albeit it does not have the ability to save sprites) or purchased on Steam or Itch.io. Aseprite source code and binaries are distributed under EULA, educational, and Steam proprietary licenses.

== History ==
Aseprite, formerly known as Allegro Sprite Editor, had its first release in 2001 as a free software project under the GPLv2 license. This license was kept until August 2016 with version v1.1.8, when the developers switched to a EULA, thus making the software proprietary. On the 1st of September 2016, the main developer, David Capello, wrote a post on the Aseprite Devblog explaining this change. The EULA permits others to download the Aseprite source code, compile it, and use it for personal purposes, but forbids its redistribution to third parties. After the license change, LibreSprite, a free and open source version of it, was created. Both before and after the license change, Aseprite was sold online, on Steam, itch.io, and the project's website.

The project's code repository was hosted on Google Code until August 2014, when it was migrated to GitHub, where it remains hosted to date. As of October 2022, its repository has had 68 contributors and around 19 thousand stars. From 2014 to 2021, Aseprite had 66 different releases.

Aseprite was used in the development of several notable games such as TowerFall (2013), Celeste (2018), Minit (2018), Wargroove (2019), Loop Hero (2021), Eastward (2021), Unpacking (2021), Haiku the Robot (2022) and Pizza Tower (2023).

== Design and features ==
The main design purpose of Aseprite is to create animated 2D pixel-art sprites. Some of its features include:

- Layers and frames, with layer grouping and animation tagging
- Pixel-art specific transformations and tools (pixel-perfect modes, custom brushes, etc.)
- Animation real-time preview and onion skinning
- Tilemap and tileset modes
- Color palette managing, including 65 default palettes
- Color profiles and modes (RGBA, indexed and grayscale)
- Non-square pixels
- Command line interface (CLI) and Lua scripting

Aseprite uses its own binary file type to store data, which is typically saved with .ase or .aseprite extensions. Different third-party projects were developed to support parsing of .ase files in programming languages including C#, Python and JavaScript, and in game engines such as Unity and Godot.

Images and animations can be exported to different file formats including PNG, GIF, FLC, FLI, JPEG, PCX, TGA, ICO, SVG, and bitmap (BMP).

== See also ==
- Digital art
- Pixel art
- List of 2D graphics software
