= DevOps toolchain =

Tools for software development

A diagram of the DevOps stages

A DevOps toolchain is a set or combination of tools that aid in the delivery, development, and management of software applications throughout the systems development life cycle, as coordinated by an organization that uses DevOps practices.

Generally, DevOps tools fit into one or more activities, which supports specific DevOps initiatives: Plan, Create, Verify, Package, Release, Configure, Monitor, and Version Control.

== Toolchains ==
In software, a toolchain is the set of programming tools that is used to perform a complex software development task or to create a software product, which is typically another computer program or a set of related programs. In general, the tools forming a toolchain are executed consecutively so the output or resulting environment state of each tool becomes the input or starting environment for the next one, but the term is also used when referring to a set of related tools that are not necessarily executed consecutively.

As DevOps is a set of practices that emphasizes the collaboration and communication of both software developers and other information technology (IT) professionals, while automating the process of software delivery and infrastructure changes, its implementation can include the definition of the series of tools used at various stages of the lifecycle; because DevOps is a cultural shift and collaboration between development and operations, there is no one product that can be considered a single DevOps tool. Instead a collection of tools, potentially from a variety of vendors, are used in one or more stages of the lifecycle.

== Stages of DevOps ==
=== Plan ===
Plan consists of two elements: "define" and "plan". This activity refers to the business value and application requirements. Specifically "Plan" activities include:

- Production metrics, objects and feedback
- Requirements
- Business metrics
- Update release metrics
- Release plan, timing and business case
- Security policy and requirement

A combination of the IT personnel will be involved in these activities: business application owners, software development, software architects, continual release management, security officers and the organization responsible for managing the production of IT infrastructure.

=== Create ===
Create consists of the building, coding, and configuring of the software development process. The specific activities are:

- Design of the software and configuration
- Coding including code quality and performance
- Software build and build performance
- Release candidate

Tools and vendors in this category often overlap with other categories. Because DevOps is about breaking down silos, this is reflective in the activities and product solutions.

=== Verify ===
Verify is directly associated with ensuring the quality of the software release; activities designed to ensure code quality is maintained and the highest quality is deployed to production. The main activities in this are:

- Acceptance testing
- Regression testing
- Security and vulnerability analysis
- Performance
- Configuration testing

Solutions for verify-related activities generally fall under four main categories: Test automation, Static analysis, Test Lab, and Security.

=== Package ===
Package refers to the activities involved once the release is ready for deployment, often also referred to as staging or Preproduction / "preprod". This often includes tasks and activities such as:

- Approval/preapprovals
- Package configuration
- Triggered releases
- Release staging and holding

=== Release ===
Release related activities include schedule, orchestration, provisioning and deploying software into production and targeted environment. The specific Release activities include:

- Release coordination
- Deploying and promoting applications
- Fallbacks and recovery
- Scheduled/timed releases

Solutions that cover this aspect of the toolchain include application release automation, deployment automation and release management.

=== Configure ===
Configure activities fall under the operation side of DevOps. Once software is deployed, there may be additional IT infrastructure provisioning and configuration activities required. Specific activities including:

- Infrastructure storage, database and network provisioning and configuring
- Application provision and configuration.

The main types of solutions that facilitate these activities are continuous configuration automation, configuration management, and infrastructure as code tools.

=== Monitor ===
Monitoring is an important link in a DevOps toolchain. It allows IT organization to identify specific issues of specific releases and to understand the impact on end-users. A summary of Monitor related activities are:

- Performance of IT infrastructure
- End-user response and experience
- Production metrics and statistics

Information from monitoring activities often impacts Plan activities required for changes and for new release cycles.

=== Version Control ===
Version Control is an important link in a DevOps toolchain and a component of software configuration management. Version Control is the management of changes to documents, computer programs, large web sites, and other collections of information. A summary of Version Control related activities are:

- Non-linear development
- Distributed development
- Compatibility with existent systems and protocols
- Toolkit-based design

Information from Version Control often supports Release activities required for changes and for new release cycles.

== See also ==
- Continuous delivery
- Continuous integration
- Agile software development
