= Haiku the Robot =

2022 video game

- Developer(s): Mister Morris Games
- Publisher(s): Mister Morris Games
- Engine: Unity
- Platform(s): Windows; macOS; Nintendo Switch
- Release: macOS, Windows; 28 April 2022; Switch; 9 September 2022
- Genre(s): Metroidvania
- Mode(s): Single-player

Haiku the Robot (stylized as Haiku, the Robot) is a 2022 Metroidvania video game developed and published by Estonian studio Mister Morris Games. It was released on 28 April 2022 for Windows and macOS, and for Nintendo Switch on 9 September 2022.

== Gameplay ==
Haiku the Robot is a 2D side-scrolling metroidvania. Players control a robot named Haiku, as he fights through a ruined world populated by robots corrupted through a computer virus. Haiku can attack using a sword, pass through enemies by dashing, and jump. As Haiku kills foes, he collects scrap metal, which Haiku can spend immediately to restore his health, or save to buy power-ups at shops. Whenever Haiku dies, he loses half of obtained scrap metal; However, he can buy a certain item that allows him to store the scrap metal at a vault when needed. Haiku can also equip a limited number of "chips" that give him new abilities and powers, such as greater health or an improvement to his sword. Chips can be bought at shops, with the player also able to buy "slots" that increase the number of chips Haiku is able to equip.

== Reception ==
According to review aggregate website Metacritic, Haiku the Robot received "generally favorable reviews" for its Switch version. Commentators frequently drew comparisons between Haiku the Robot and the 2017 metroidvania game Hollow Knight. Nintendo World Report liked the currency system with scrap metal, but disliked that the world gave few objectives that the player could work towards, and felt as though the sword attack was boring. The reviewer for Kotaku said that Haiku the Robot was one of the best Metroidvania games that he had ever played, and praised the low difficulty, art style, and music.
