= Automated Weather Source =

American weather station network

- Founded: 1992
- Founder: Mike Bailey, Topper Shutt, Bill Mengel, Bob Marshall, and Chris Sloop
- Headquarters: Germantown, Maryland, U.S.
- Website: aws.com

Automated Weather Source (AWS) was a partnership and later a corporation founded in 1992 by James Michael "Mike" Bailey and Charles "Topper" Shutt of Montgomery County, Maryland, whose purpose was to create a network of weather stations located at public schools and recreational facilities throughout the Mid-Atlantic region of the United States.

The weather data generated was accessed by dialup modem and included wind speed, wind direction, barometric pressure, temperature, and rainfall totals, along with daily minimum and maximum values of each. The network of primarily school-based weather stations became the first to generate real-time meteorological data for use on broadcast television when the AWS network was first referenced on September 11, 1992, during the nightly newscast of WUSA-TV (Channel 9) in Washington, D.C.

The AWS concept encouraged academic and recreational institutions to increase localized community awareness by soliciting donors to help them join the network. A computer and software interfaced to the weather station, provided access to each site, and enabled the user to download near real-time and archived surface weather observations. The meteorological data were then used in the classroom as part of multiple curricula. The real time data was shared with the general public on broadcast media and provided to the National Weather Service (NWS) for internal use and eventual integration into AFOS (Automation of Field Operations and Services), the computer system in place at the time linking NWS offices for the transmission of weather data now known as AWIPS. Headquartered in Darnestown, Maryland, the Automated Weather Source partnership formed in 1992 was incorporated in January 1994. Implementations of AWS' core concept, often referred to as "SchoolNet" or "WeatherNet," then began to expand into many other major US television markets over the course of the 1990s.

== History ==
=== Initial AWS methodology ===
Prior to the formation of the AWS partnership formed in 1992 by founders Bailey and Shutt, Bailey, an amateur weather enthusiast, worked with meteorologist Andrew Stern, then lead forecaster at the Sterling, Virginia National Weather Service forecast office. Stern and Bailey initially compiled code to access and download observations via dialup phone modem from a HeathKit 5001 weather station. In an effort to access the data more efficiently, Bailey acquired a weather station produced by Texas Weather Instruments (TWI) that allowed direct access to the weather data. The TWI instrument, known as a Weather Report, became one of the first sources for local, hourly weather observations by a non-standard weather data platform to be accessed by the National Weather Service (NWS) and ingested into AFOS in the Washington, D.C., area.

=== Creation of AWS network ===
As a NWS storm spotter, and having previously worked as an intern and weather watcher for WRC-TV, Bailey recognized the importance of localized weather data for on-air TV use. He provided Shutt with access to the weather data engine and began discussions on how and where other similar weather stations might be deployed and used in nightly local weather broadcasts. Locations considered included ski resorts and parks. Shutt suggested placement at schools, as they were at the time beginning to acquire computers and dedicated phone lines for access to remote data sources. Subsequently, Shutt and Bailey formed the Automated Weather Source Partnership, funding the purchase and donation of three weather stations to Washington-area schools to seed what became the nation's first public school network of weather stations to generate weather data for use on broadcast TV at WUSA-TV. On September 11, 1992, Automated Weather Source Network became an on-air reality and its use quickly grew in the nation's 8th largest TV market DMA.

=== Network growth ===
Within a year Montgomery, Fairfax, Howard and Loudoun County Public Schools were the first of the local technology and transportation coordinators that joined the AWS network as it grew to over thirty sites in the Washington area. The Automated Weather Source Network segment was self-promoting on air and became a community outreach tool for WUSA-TV 9. Wisp Resort, in Garrett County, Maryland, was the first ski area to purchase a unit and dedicate a phone line for access. Other Mid-Atlantic ski resorts followed suit as "Ski-net" evolved. Stevenson shelters were built and used to house the outdoor sensors on the roofs of existing sites that appeared in the Automated Weather Source Network television segment. The AWS network had grown to 30 sites as the data sets generated were also used to provide near real-time observations from school rooftops. AWS agreed to provide NWS access to the data from the network on an hourly basis for integration into the AFOS computer system. Data from each AWS station was compiled and transcribed in ASCII format. A typical observation would output to file as follows:

5:15 07/24/90 SSE 04 MPH 052F 069F 078F 099% 30.04R 00.19"D 01.38"M 11.78"T

The code written to interpret the TWI observation was ingested into AFOS, a system that has since transitioned to AWIPS, a more modern interface used to interpret the same meteorological data. An early data set example read as follows, with a four-letter identifier followed by city, state and county:

DTWN DARNESTOWN MD MG 5:15 07/24/90 SSE 04 MPH 052F 069F 072F 099% 30.04R 00.19"D 01.38"M 11.78"T

The above data set, as a weather observation, would read as follows: "At 5:15 A.M. on July 24, 1990, the temperature at the Darnestown AWS site in Montgomery County, Maryland was 52°F, with 99% relative humidity and a wind from the south-southeast at four miles per hour."

=== AWS data as a teaching tool and TV broadcast use ===
==== Social impact ====
Prior to the rapid growth of the Internet in 1992, primary media sources included print, radio, and broadcast TV. Computer science had just begun its integration into K-12 schools in major metropolitan areas. The use of computers and dial-up modems with access to digitized resources was in its infancy at the time of AWS' founding. A weather station as an engine that provided real-world data could then be integrated into each area of school curricula. Promoting such a concept by recognizing specific schools or locations on broadcast TV helped instill local civic pride. The near real-time observations used by TV broadcast media made viewers more aware of the weather conditions where they worked and lived. Television networks' use of the meteorological observations encouraged the growth of the AWS concept and the participation of local businesses in the growing effort to donate resources to help facilitate this cause.

As the Washington, D.C., metro area school systems bought into the concept, AWS began working on a way to better archive and manipulate the data generated for use as a teaching tool for computer science, mathematics, geography, and science. Students would log observations and then plot them on a local map, and a series of manually logged observations would be graphed as well. Eventually, an AWS subcontractor wrote a program that would automatically access the existing sites and download data for current observations as well as limited historical data. The program, which ran on desktop computers outfitted with 386 processors, then created graphs of historical data.

==== Criticisms and acceptance ====
AWS' founders and employees chose school rooftops to place their weather stations because of such locations' accessibility, security, proximity to electrical power and ease of maintenance. The standard location for most sensor suites at that time was at airports, in the middle of large fields, or between runways with no physical obstructions that might disturb the immediate environment. Meteorologists both in the NWS and the private sector expressed concern that AWS sites might be subject to a number of confounds, such as the skewing of wind direction by rooftop structures, the heat retained on dark rooftop surfaces, and the hot exhaust from rooftop air conditioning units, all of which were thought to cause inaccuracies in the data.

Despite these concerns, meteorologists used AWS data to assist in the study of various weather phenomena, including the heat island effect. One such study, presented to the American Meteorological Society by Davey et al. of Colorado State University, cited examples and placement of multiple AWS network sites. Each mesonet site was subject to environmental factors which differed from the official configuration of an NWS-certified ASOS weather station. As rooftop weather station configurations grew more widely available, however, rooftop observations became an accepted measure of meteorological data dissemination in the scientific community, with an understanding that the sites were considered nonstandard configurations. Armed with the metadata that highlighted the biases in rooftop observations, meteorologists used rooftop data in their forecasts at their own professional discretion.

=== Steps toward incorporation ===
The WUSA-TV Automated Weather Source Network on-air segment soon attracted the attention of Bill Mengel, then founder and owner of EAI Corporation. EAI products included the manufacturing of air sensors for commercial and military use. Mengel sent then-EAI employee Robert "Bob" Marshall to meet with AWS founders Shutt and Bailey to discuss the possibility of manufacturing a more sophisticated weather station. EAI's background in air monitoring equipment, along with the engineering background of Marshall and Christopher Sloop, an engineer and computer programmer at EAI, brought a valuable skill set to the partnership. The discussions led to the development of a prototype of the first AWS-manufactured weather station and data display unit as well as the development of refined software needed to access and utilize the AWS network in schools and on-the-air.

== AWS Incorporated ==
Within 4 months of partnering with Mengel and EAI, the Automated Weather Source Partnership converted to a corporation, AWS Convergence Technologies, Inc. Its principal owners included Topper Shutt, Mike Bailey, Bill Mengel, Bob Marshall and Chris Sloop. Its main office was located in Germantown, Maryland. The hardware and software development took place in both Germantown and Abingdon, Maryland. The company was later renamed to Earth Networks.

In September 2018, the company sold the aws.com domain to Amazon Web Services.
