= Amazon Polly =

Speech synthesis software by Amazon

- Initial release: November 29, 2016
- Available in: 41 languages
- Type: Speech synthesis
- Website: aws.amazon.com/polly/

Amazon Polly is a cloud service by Amazon Web Services, a subsidiary of Amazon.com, that converts text into spoken audio. It allows developers to create speech-enabled applications and products. It was launched in November 2016 and (as of December 2024) includes 100+ voices across 41 language variants, some of which are Neural Text-to-Speech voices of higher quality. Users include Duolingo, a language education platform.

== See also ==
- Amazon Lex
- Amazon Rekognition
- Amazon SageMaker
- Amazon Web Services
- Google Wavenet
