= OpenTofu =

Software orchestration tool

- Developer: Linux Foundation
- Stable release: 1.12.3 / 18 June 2026
- Written in: Go
- Predecessor: Terraform
- License: Mozilla Public License 2.0
- Website: opentofu.org
- Repository: github.com/opentofu/opentofu

OpenTofu is a software project for infrastructure as code that is managed by the Linux Foundation.

== History ==
In August 2023, after HashiCorp had relicensed Terraform from MPL to BUSL, a fork of Terraform, OpenTF, was created that continued under the MPL. In September, the project was renamed to OpenTofu due to trademark concerns.

In April 2024, HashiCorp sent a cease and desist notice to the OpenTofu project, stating that it had incorporated code from a BUSL-licensed version of Terraform without permission and "incorrectly re-labeled HashiCorp's code to make it appear as if it was made available by HashiCorp originally under a different license." OpenTofu denied the allegation, stating that the code cited had originated from an MPL-licensed version of Terraform.
