= Business Source License =

Software license

- Author: MariaDB plc
- Latest version: 1.1
- Publisher: MariaDB plc
- Published: 2024 (version 1.1)
- SPDX identifier: BUSL-1.1
- Debian FSG compatible: No
- FSF approved: No
- OSI approved: No
- GPL compatible: No
- Copyleft: No
- Website: https://mariadb.com/bsl11/

The Business Source License (SPDX id BUSL-1.1) is a software license which publishes source code but limits the right to use the software to certain classes of users. The BUSL is not an open-source license, but is a source-available license that also mandates an eventual transition to an open-source license. This characteristic has been described as a compromise between traditional proprietary licenses and open source.

The originator of the BUSL is MariaDB plc, where it is used for the MaxScale product, not for the flagship MariaDB.

== Terms ==
The Business Source License requires the work to be relicensed to a "Change License" at the "Change Date". The "Change License" must be a "license which is compatible with GPL version 2.0 or later". The Change Date must be four years or sooner from the publication date of the work being licensed.

The Business Source License by default restricts production use. The license allows copyright owners to specify an "Additional Use Grant". In a 2020 survey of adoption of this license, open source developer and entrepreneur Adam Retter summarized this:

Additional Use Grant (Optional) The BUSL by default prohibits production use of the software. This parameter can optionally be used to grant additional rights to the licensee by the licensor. For example, so that it may be used with various restrictions in some form of production environment. It cannot be used to limit the other rights granted by the license.

== Adoption ==
The BUSL has been used by some projects to move away from open source licensing to achieve a sustainable revenue model by applying restrictions not possible with an open source license, while aiming to provide many existing users with the same access and contribution rights as under the original open source license. Each specific instance of the license is expected to define the user class which is prohibited; the default is to exclude production use. Typically the exclusion applies to production use or to cloud vendors charging for hosted access to the software. Such users must obtain a commercial license.

The move of some projects away from open source licensing is controversial in the open source community. In October 2023 the Linux Foundation addressed this with an article, and used the Business Source License as the defining representation of this threat to open source.

=== HashiCorp ===
In August 2023, HashiCorp announced it was moving all its previously open source products to the Business Source License 1.1.

The motivation for the change from an open source license to the BUSL in the case of HashiCorp is explained thus:

Organizations providing competitive offerings to HashiCorp will no longer be permitted to use the community edition products free of charge under our BUSL license. Commercial licensing terms are available and can enable use cases beyond the BUSL limitations.

The move of HashiCorp's Terraform software to the Business Source License sparked the creation of the OpenTofu fork. OpenTofu describes the Business Source License as being "ambiguous" and "challenging for companies, vendors, and developers using Terraform to decide whether their actions could be interpreted as being outside the permitted scope of use".

=== Other projects ===
Other prominent projects which moved from an open source license to the Business Source License include:

- CockroachDB
- SurrealDB,
- trieve.ai
- EMQX

== Relicensing and the CLA controversy ==
The license change is enabled by requiring contributors to agree to a Contributor License Agreement (CLA) which assigns to the project sponsor the right to publish contributions under non-open-source licenses, even when the project license was an open source license. The Kyodo Tech blog says that "Recent shifts in the open source landscape, such as HashiCorp’s decision" have "reignited debates on balancing business needs with open source principles. The use of Contributor License Agreements (CLAs) sits at the heart of this discussion"
