= Amazon Simple Notification Service =

Cloud-based service

- Developer: Amazon.com
- Release: 2010
- License: Proprietary software
- Website: aws.amazon.com/sns

Amazon Simple Notification Service (Amazon SNS) is a notification service provided as part of Amazon Web Services since 2010. It provides a service for sending messages.

Amazon SNS acts as a single message bus that can message to a variety of devices and platforms. A single code interface can address all of these equally, or message formats can be tailored to the particular needs of each platform. Amazon SNS can also deliver messages by SMS to 200+ countries.

== Description ==
Amazon SNS uses the publish/subscribe model for delivery of messages. Recipients subscribe to one or more 'topics' within Amazon SNS. This may be hidden from the user as an internal part of a mobile app. Receipt of a message may also be hidden from the user: this service is largely aimed at the internal processing of specific apps rather than as a generic email substitute. A game might receive bonus-level announcements or unlock keys for in-game purchases by this route. A ticket booking app could use it for confirmation vouchers, boarding passes or notifications of a delay to a flight.
