= Orchestration (computing) =

Automated configuration, coordination, and management of computer systems and software

In system administration, orchestration is the automated configuration, coordination, deployment, and management of computer systems and software. Many tools exist for automating server configuration and management.

== Usage ==
Orchestration is often discussed in the context of service-oriented architecture, virtualization, provisioning, converged infrastructure, and dynamic data center topics. Orchestration in this sense is about aligning the business request with the applications, data, and infrastructure.

In the context of cloud computing, the main difference between workflow automation and orchestration is that workflows are processed and completed as processes within a single domain for automation purposes. Orchestration, meanwhile, incorporates workflows and provides a directed action towards larger goals and objectives.

In this context, and with the overall aim of achieving specific goals and objectives (described through the quality of service parameters), for example, meet application performance goals using minimized cost and maximize application performance within budget constraints, cloud management solutions also encompass frameworks for workflow mapping and management. In the context of application programming interfaces (APIs), API orchestration refers to the process of integrating multiple APIs into a unified system to streamline workflows and enhance user experience. The approach coordinates the flow of data, the execution sequence, and the dependencies among different APIs to achieve a defined business objective. API orchestration is commonly applied in environments that utilize microservices architectures or legacy systems, where the interaction of several APIs is required to complete a task.

== See also ==
- Job Control Language
- System management
- Web service choreography
- Configuration management
- Infrastructure as code
- Server provisioning
- Service-oriented architecture
- Kubernetes
- Job scheduler
- List of orchestration software
