= HashiCorp =

Cloud-computing software company

HashiCorp, Inc.
- Type: Subsidiary
- Traded as: Nasdaq: HCP (2021–2025)
- Industry: IT infrastructure
- Founded: 2012; 14 years ago
- Founders: Mitchell Hashimoto; Armon Dadgar
- Headquarters: 101 Second Street, San Francisco, California, United States
- Area served: Global
- Key people: David McJannet (CEO)
- Revenue: ▲US$583 million (2024)
- Operating income: ▲US$−254 million (2024)
- Net income: ▲US$−191 million (2024)
- Total assets: ▲US$1.69 billion (2024)
- Total equity: ▲US$1.21 billion (2024)
- Number of employees: c. 2,200 (2024)
- Parent: IBM (2025–present)
- Website: hashicorp.com
- Footnotes; Financials as of January 31, 2024.

HashiCorp, Inc. is an American software company and subsidiary of IBM based in San Francisco, California. IBM completed its acquisition of HashiCorp on 27 February 2025 in a transaction valued at US$6.4 billion. HashiCorp provides tools and products that enable developers, operators and security professionals to provision, secure, run and connect cloud-computing infrastructure. It was founded in 2012 by Mitchell Hashimoto and Armon Dadgar. The company name HashiCorp is a portmanteau of co-founder last name Hashimoto and Corporation.

HashiCorp is headquartered in San Francisco, but its employees are distributed across the United States, Canada, Australia, India, and Europe. HashiCorp offers source-available libraries and other proprietary products.

== History ==
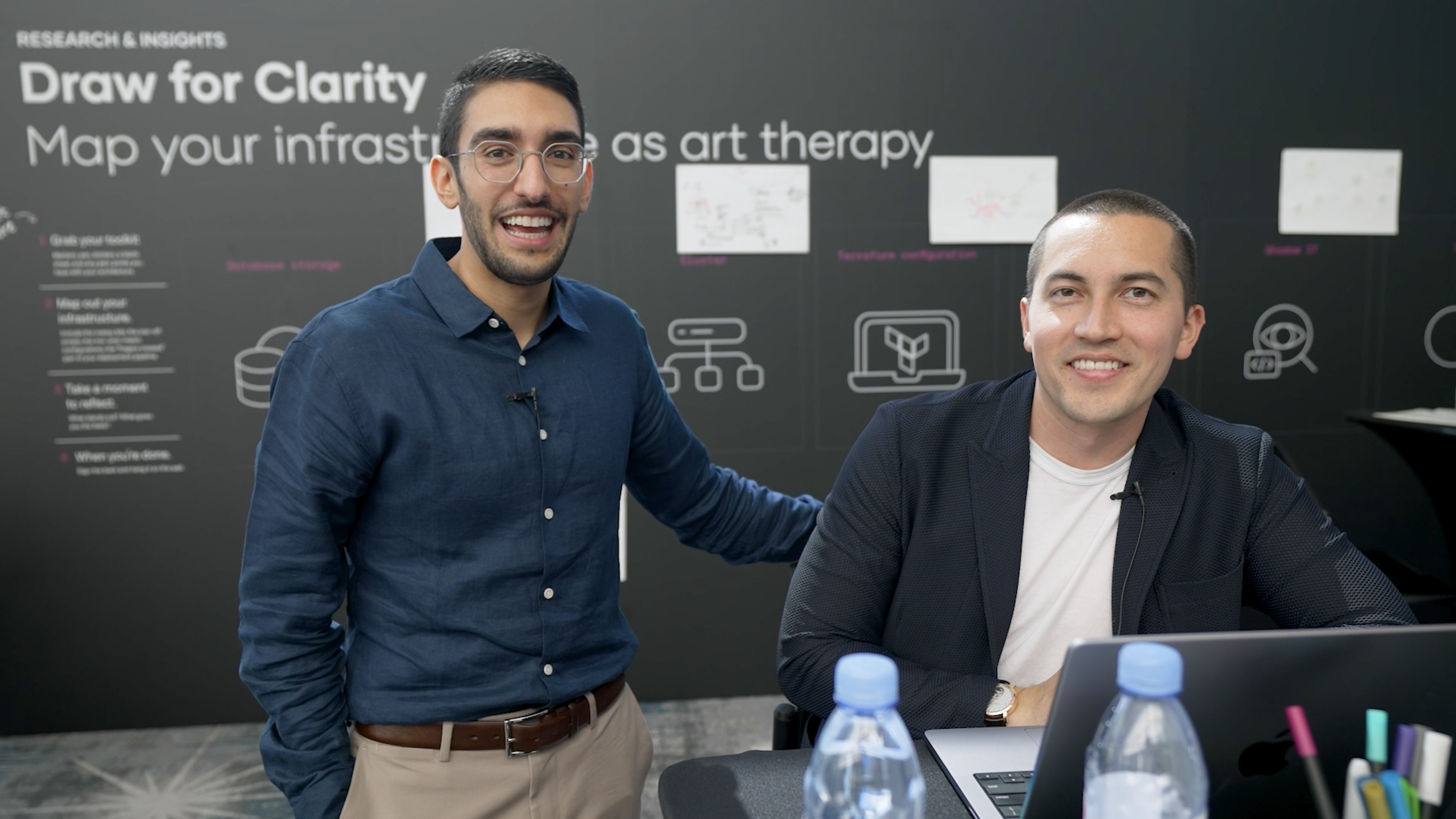
Founders Armon Dadgar and Mitchell Hashimoto

HashiCorp was founded in 2012 by Mitchell Hashimoto and Armon Dadgar, two classmates from the University of Washington's Paul G. Allen School of Computer Science and Engineering. Co-founder Hashimoto was previously working on open-source software called Vagrant, which became incorporated into HashiCorp.

On 29 November 2021, HashiCorp set terms for its IPO at $68-$72 at a valuation of $13 billion. It offered 15.3 million shares. HashiCorp considers its workers to be remote workers first rather than coming into an office on a full-time basis.

Around April 2021, a supply chain attack using code auditing tool codecov allowed hackers limited access to HashiCorp's customers networks. As a result, private credentials were leaked. HashiCorp revoked a private signing key and asked its customers to use a new rotated key.

Mitchell Hashimoto resigned from the company in December 2023.

=== Acquisition by IBM ===
On April 24, 2024, the company announced it had entered into an agreement to be acquired by IBM for $6.4 billion, with the transaction expected to close by the end of the same year. This led to the Competition and Markets Authority of the United Kingdom launching an investigation into the acquisition in late 2024. The deal closed on February 27, 2025 for $6.4 billion after receiving the necessary regulatory approvals.

== Products ==
HashiCorp provides a suite of tools intended to support the development and deployment of large-scale service-oriented software installations. Each tool is aimed at specific stages in the life cycle of a software application, with a focus on automation. Many have a plugin-oriented architecture in order to provide integration with third-party technologies and services. Additional proprietary features for some of these tools are offered commercially and are aimed at enterprise customers.
