= Amazon Lex =

Amazon Alexa software

Amazon Lex is a service for building conversational interfaces into any application using voice and text. It powers the Amazon Alexa virtual assistant. In April 2017, the platform was released to the developer community, and suggested that it could be used for conversational interfaces (chatbots or otherwise) including Web, mobile apps, robots, toys, drones, and more. Amazon already had launched Alexa Voice Services, which developers can use to integrate Alexa into their own devices, like smart speakers, alarm clocks, etc.; however, Lex will not require that end users interact with the Alexa assistant per se, but rather any type of assistant or interface. By February 2018, users could define responses for Amazon Lex chatbots directly through the AWS management console. In 2021, Amazon released Amazon Lex V2, an updated management console accompanied by a new set of V2 APIs. Lex V2 introduced support for multiple languages within a single bot, with all languages managed as a single resource.
