= List of systems management systems =

This is a list of notable systems management systems.

== Overview ==
FCAPS
Fault
Configuration
Accounting
Performance
Security

System	Creator	Open source	FCAPS functions					Management technologies
System	Creator	Open source	F	C	A	P	S	Management technologies
Ansible	Red Hat, Ansible Inc. (formerly)	Yes	?	?	?	?	?	Agentless, SSH
Apple Remote Desktop	Apple	No	?	Yes	?	?	?	Proprietary, SSH
Bcfg2	Narayan Desai et al.	Yes	No	Yes	No	No	No	XML-RPC
Cfengine	Mark Burgess et al.	Yes	No	Yes	No	No	No	Proprietary
Chef	Progress Software (acquired Chef)	Yes	?	Yes	?	?	?	Client/Server (Agents), Ruby (client) and Ruby / Erlang (server), SSH
Foreman	Paul Kelly and Ohad Levy	Yes	?	?	?	?	?	?
ISconf	Steve Traugott et al.	Yes	?	?	?	?	?	?
KACE	KACE	No	No	Yes	Yes	No	Yes	SNMP, WMI, and PXE
LANrev	LANrev	No	No	Yes	Yes	No	Yes	
Landscape	Canonical Ltd.	?	?	?	?	?	?	
Local ConFiGuration system	Paul Anderson et al.	Yes	No	Yes	No	No	No	XML over HTTP
Nagios	Ethan Galstad	Yes	Yes	Yes	Yes	Yes	No	SNMP, WMI (via Addon), JMX
OpenNMS	OpenNMS Group	Yes	Yes	No	No	Yes	No	SNMP
OpenView products	Hewlett-Packard	No	Yes	Yes	No	Yes	No	SNMP, WMI, and others
opsi (open pc server integration)	uib gmbh	Yes	No	Yes	No	No	No	PXE, WMI, JSON over HTTPS
Oracle Enterprise Manager	Oracle Corporation	No	?	?	?	?	?	?
Oracle OPS Center	Oracle Corporation	No	?	?	?	?	?	?
Puppet	Puppet Labs	Yes	No	Yes	No	No	No	?
Quattor	Rafael Angel García Leiva et al.	Yes	No	Yes	No	No	No	XML (?) over HTTP, SOAP
Saltstack	SaltStack	Yes	?	?	?	?	?	ssh, Python
Satellite	Red Hat	?	?	?	?	?	?	?
Spacewalk	Red Hat	Yes	?	Yes	?	?	Yes	XML-RPC
System Center Configuration Manager	Microsoft	No	No	Yes	Yes	No	Yes	WMI, SNMP
TeamQuest Performance Software	TeamQuest Corporation	No	No	No	Yes	Yes	No	?
Unicenter products	CA, Inc.	No	?	?	?	?	?	?
Zabbix	Zabbix LLC	Yes	Yes	No	No	Yes	No	SNMP, TCP and ICMP checks, IPMI, JMX, Telnet and SSH
Zenoss Core	Zenoss Inc.	Yes	Yes	Yes	No	Yes	No	SNMP, WMI, XML-RPC, SSH
ZENworks products	Novell	No	?	Yes	?	?	Yes	?

== See also ==
- Configuration management
- Comparison of network monitoring systems
- Comparison of open-source configuration management software
- Systems management
