= Continuous configuration automation =

Automating deployment and configuration of software for data centers

Continuous configuration automation (CCA) is the methodology or process of automating the deployment and configuration of settings and software for both physical and virtual data center equipment.

== Overview ==
Continuous configuration automation is marketed for data center and application configuration management. CCA tools use a programmable framework for configuration and orchestration through coding, planning, and incrementally adopting policies.

== Relationship to DevOps ==
CCA tools are used for what is called DevOps, and are often included as part of a DevOps toolchain. CCA grew out of a push to develop more reliable software faster. Gartner describes CCA as “Embodying lean, agile and collaborative concepts core to DevOps initiatives, CCA tools bring a newly found level of precision, efficiency and flexibility to the challenges of infrastructure and application configuration management.”

== Tools ==
CCA tools support administrators and developers to automate the configuration and orchestration of physical and virtual infrastructure in a systematic way that give visibility to state of infrastructure within an enterprise. Generally thought of as an extension of infrastructure as code (IaC) frameworks. CCA tools include Ansible, Chef, Otter, Puppet, Rudder and Salt. Each tool has a different method of interacting with the system; some are agent-based, push or pull, through an interactive UI. Similar to adopting any DevOps tools, there are barriers to bring on CCA tools and factors that hinder and accelerate adoption.

Notable CCA tools include:

Tool	Developed by	Initial release	Method	Approach	Written in
Ansible	Red Hat	2012; 14 years ago	Push	Declarative and imperative	Python
CFEngine	Northern.tech	1993; 33 years ago	Pull	Declarative	C
Chef	Progress	2009; 17 years ago	Pull	Imperative	Ruby
OpenTofu	Linux Foundation	2023; 3 years ago	Push	Declarative	Go
Otter	Inedo	2015; 11 years ago	Push	Declarative and imperative	—
Puppet	Puppet	2005; 21 years ago	Pull	Declarative	C++, Clojure since 4.0, Ruby
Salt	VMware	2011; 15 years ago	Push and Pull	Declarative and imperative	Python
Terraform	HashiCorp	2014; 12 years ago	Push	Declarative	Go

== Evaluation factors ==
Evaluations of CCA tools may consider the following:

- Skills, training, and cost required to implement and maintain tool
- Content and support of the Platform and Infrastructure – tool specified for Windows or Linux etc.
- Delivery method and likening flexibility – important for scalability
- Method of interacting with managing system
- Support and training availability and cost
- Incorporation of orchestration with configuration management
- Security and compliance reporting

== See also ==
- Agile software development
- Continuous delivery
- Continuous integration
- Software configuration management
