= Comparison of open-source configuration management software =

This is a comparison of notable free and open-source configuration management software, suitable for tasks like server configuration, orchestration and infrastructure as code typically performed by a system administrator.

== Basic properties ==
"Verify mode" (also called dry run) refers to having an ability to determine whether a node is conformant with a guarantee of not modifying it, and typically involves the exclusive use of an internal language supporting read-only mode for all potentially system-modifying operations. Mutual authentication (mutual auth) refers to the client verifying the server and vice versa.

Agent describes whether additional software daemons are required. Depending on the management software these agents are usually deployed on the target system or on one or many central controller servers. Although Agent-less = No is colored red and might seem to be a negative, instead, having an agent can be considered quite advantageous to many. Consider the impact if an agent-less tool loses connectivity to a node while making critical changes—leaving the node in an indeterminate state that compromises its (production?) function.

	Language	License	Mutual auth.	Encryption	Verify mode	Agent-less	Incl. GUI	First release	Latest stable release
Ansible	Python	GPLv3+	Yes (Note: Key pair: uses public/private key pairs and key fingerprints for mutual authentication, like SSH.)	Yes (Note: Secure Shell: Uses the Secure Shell protocol for encryption.)	Yes	Yes	Yes	2012-03-08	2026-06-18 2.18.18
Bcfg2	Python	BSD 2-clause	Yes (Note: Certificate and Passwords: Uses SSL X.509 certificate and fingerprint for clients to authenticate server, and passwords for server to authenticate clients; clients should only share the same password if they are allowed access to each other's configuration data.)	Yes (Note: SSL: Uses the Secure Sockets Layer, Transport Layer Security (TLS) for encryption.)	Yes (Note: Full support for non-modifying determination of node compliance, including nodes not previously modified by a Bcfg2 configuration pass.)	No	Yes	2004-08-11	2015-06-11 1.3.6
Capistrano	Ruby	MIT		Yes		Yes	No	2005	2022-08-07 3.17.1
cdist	Python	GPLv3+	Yes	Yes		Yes		2010	2021-08-24 6.9.8
Chef	Ruby, Erlang	Apache 2.0	Yes (Note: Per request signed headers and pre-shared keys.)	Yes (Note: Payload encryption via SSL if HTTPS proxy is configured.)	Yes (Note: Chef 10.14.0+ (called why-run mode))	No	Yes	2009-01-15 0.5.0	2026-07-13 18.11.11 (client), 15.10.114 (server)
CFEngine	C	GPLv3	Yes	Yes	Yes	No	Yes	1993	2026-11-06 3.29.0, 2026-10-22 3.27.3, 2026-10-22 3.24.6
Consfigurator	Common Lisp (SBCL)	GPLv3+	Yes	Yes			No		2024-07-26 1.4.2
Guix	Scheme (Guile)	GPLv3+	Yes	Yes		No	No		2022-12-19 1.4.0
ISconf	Python	GPL	Yes (Note: HMAC: Uses HMAC signatures on all network traffic.)	No				1998	2006-08-13 4.2.8.233
Juju	Python, Go	AGPL	Yes	Yes	No	No	Yes	2010-09-17	2025-06-09 3.6.7
Local ConFiGuration system (LCFG)	Perl	GPL	Partial	Partial	No	No	No	1994	Weekly Releases
NOC Project	Python	BSD 2.0	Yes	Yes	Yes	Yes	Yes	2012-03-08	2015-05-20 15.05.1
OCS Inventory NG with GLPI	Perl, PHP, C++	GPL	No	Yes		No		2003	2026-04-23
Open pc server integration (Opsi)	Python, Java	GPL	No	Yes		No		2004	2013-03-01 4.0.3
PIKT	C	GPLv2+	Yes	Yes		No		1998	2007-09-10 1.19.0
Puppet	Ruby, C++ & Clojure (server-side also Ruby before 4.0)	Apache since 2.7.0, GPL before then	Yes (Note: Certificates: Uses SSL X.509 Certificates for mutual authentication. Can use any SSL Certificate Authority to manage the Public Key Infrastructure.)	Yes	Yes (Note: Using the --noop option)	No	Yes	2005-08-30	2026-06 8.20.0 (client), 2024-04 8.9.9 (server)
Pyinfra	Python	MIT License	Yes	Yes	Yes	Yes		2016-08-10 0.1	2025-01-30 3.2
Quattor	Perl, Python	Apache 2.0	Yes	Yes	Partial	No		2005-04-01	2026-04-07 26.2.0
Radmind	C	BSD	Yes	Yes		No		2002-03-26	2008-10-08 1.13.0
Rex	Perl	Apache	Yes	Yes		Yes		2010-11-05 0.9.0	2025-07-05 1.16.1
Rudder	C, Scala, Rust	GPLv3, Apache 2.0	Yes	Yes	Yes (Note: Using the Audit mode.)	No	Yes	2011-10-31	2026-07-09 9.1.3
SmartFrog	Java	Apache 2.0	Yes	Yes		No		2004-02-11	2012-03-13 3.18.016
Salt	Python	Apache 2.0	Yes	Yes	Yes	Both	Yes	2011-03-17 0.6.0	2026-07-01 v3008.-2
Spacewalk	Java (C, Perl, Python, PL/SQL)	GPLv2	Yes	Yes		No		2008-06	2019-01-14 2.9
STAF	C++	CPL	No (Note: Network Trust: Trusts the network, like rsh.) (Note: User-only Auth: User authenticates to server via password, but uses Network Trust to authenticate user to server, like telnet.)	Partial		No		1998-02-16	2012-12-16 3.4.16
Synctool	Python	GPLv2	Yes (Note: Secure Shell: Uses the Secure Shell protocol for authentication.)	Yes	Yes (Note: Synctool performs a dry-run by default, and only modifies things when invoked with '--fix'.)	Yes		2003	2019-08-11 6.3
Uyuni	Java, Python, PL/SQL (Perl)	GPLv2, Apache 2.0	Yes	Yes	Yes	Both	Yes	2018-06	2024-01-31-01 2024.01
	Language	License	Mutual auth	Encrypts	Verify mode	Agent-less	Have a GUI	First release	Latest stable release

== Platform support ==
Note: This means platforms on which a recent version of the tool has actually been used successfully, not platforms where it should theoretically work since it is written in good portable C/C++ or an interpreted language. It should also be listed as a supported platform on the project's web site.

	AIX	*BSD	HP-UX	Linux	OS X	Solaris	Windows	Others
Ansible	Yes	Yes	Yes	Yes	Yes	Yes	Partial (Note: yes for managed machine; no for managing machine)	Yes
Bcfg2	Partial (Note: Encap, RPM, and POSIX file support only.)	Yes (Note: FreeBSD.)	No	Yes (Note: Debian, Ubuntu; Gentoo; RPM-based distributions (CentOS, Mandrake, Red Hat, RHEL, SLES, SuSE))	Partial (Note: POSIX File, Launchd, and MacPorts Support only.)	Yes	No	No
CFEngine	Yes	Yes	Yes	Yes	Yes	Yes	Yes (enterprise version only)	Yes (Note: Unix.)
cdist		Yes		Yes	Yes		No	
Chef	Yes	Yes	Yes	Yes	Yes	Yes	Yes	Yes
Consfigurator		Partial		Yes			No	
Guix	No	No	No	Partial (Note: "Only support Guix system.")	No	No	No	Partial (Note: "It also works on Guix system with HURD.")
ISconf	Yes	Yes	Yes	Yes	Yes	Yes	No	No
Juju				Yes			Yes	
Local ConFiGuration system (LCFG)	No	No	No	Partial (Note: "Recent versions run on Fedora Core (3, 5, 6). Various people have ported some of the LCFG core to other Linux distributions, such as Debian, but these ports have not been incorporated")	Partial (Note: "There has been an experimental port to OS X, which does work and includes some Mac-specific components. However, this is not production quality and the lack of uniform packaging system under OS X means that automatic management of installed software is likely to be difficult.")	Partial (Note: "LCFG core has been ported back to Solaris and we are using this in production, although the software has not been packaged for distribution, and is not so well supported")	No	No
OCS Inventory NG	Yes	Yes	Yes	Yes	Yes	Yes	Yes	No
Open pc server integration (Opsi)	No	No	No	Yes	No	No	Yes	No
PIKT	Yes	Yes	Yes	Yes	Yes	Yes	No	Yes (Note: Digital Unix; IRIX)
Puppet	Yes	Yes	Yes	Yes	Yes	Yes	Yes	Yes
Pyinfra		Yes		Yes	Yes		Partial	
Quattor	No	No	No	Yes	Partial	Yes	No	No
Radmind	Yes	Yes (Note: NetBSD.) (Note: OpenBSD.)	No	Yes	Yes	Yes	Yes	No
Rex		Yes		Yes	Yes	Yes	Yes	No
Rudder	Yes	Partial (Note: Multiple users have successfully built and run the agent on FreeBSD, but no official package is available currently.)	No	Yes	Partial	Partial	Yes	Yes (Note: Android.)
SmartFrog	No (Note: Written in Java, so should in theory work on this platform if there is the appropriate JVM version available for it; however it has not been tested on the platform, which should be considered unsupported.)	No	Yes	Yes	Yes	Yes	Yes	No
Salt	Yes	Yes	Partial (Note: Will run anywhere Python runs, but handlers for different platforms are untested.)	Yes	Yes	Yes	Yes	Partial
Spacewalk	No	No	No	Yes	No	No	No	No
STAF	Yes (Note: 4.3.3+ (Power 32); 5.1+ (Power 32/64))	Yes (Note: FreeBSD 4.10 (x86-32); FreeBSD 6.1+ (x86-32))	Yes (Note: 11.00+ (PA-RISC 32, IA-64))	Yes (Note: (x86-32, x86-64, IA-64, PPC 64, zSeries 32/64))	Yes	Yes (Note: 2.6+ (Sparc 32); 10+ (x86-32, x86-64))	Yes (Note: 95, 98, Me, NT4, 2000, XP, 2003, Vista (x86-32), 7 (x86-32), 7 (x86-64); 2003, Vista (x86-64); 2004 (IA-64))	Yes (Note: OS/400 5.2+ (iSeries 32); z/OS Unix 1.4+)
Synctool	Yes	Yes	Yes	Yes	Yes	Yes	No	Yes (Note: Synctool runs on any platform that supports SSH, rsync and Python.)
Uyuni	No	No	No	Partial (Note: SuSE")	No	No	No	No
	AIX	*BSD	HP-UX	Linux	OS X	Solaris	Windows	Others

== Short descriptions ==
Not all tools have the same goal and the same feature set. To help distinguish between all of these software packages, here is a short description of each one.

Ansible
Combines multi-node deployment, ad-hoc task execution, and configuration management in one package. Manages nodes over SSH and requires python (2.6+ or 3.5+) to be installed on them. Modules work over JSON and standard output and can be written in any language. Uses YAML to express reusable descriptions of systems.

Bcfg2
Software to manage the configuration of a large number of computers using a central configuration model and the client–server paradigm. The system enables reconciliation between clients' state and the central configuration specification. Detailed reports provide a way to identify unmanaged configuration on hosts. Generators enable code or template-based generation of configuration files from a central data repository.

CFEngine
Lightweight agent system. Manages configuration of a large number of computers using the client–server paradigm or stand-alone. Any client state which is different from the policy description is reverted to the desired state. Configuration state is specified via a declarative language. CFEngine's paradigm is convergent "computer immunology".

cdist
cdist is a zero dependency configuration management system: It requires only ssh on the target host, which is usually enabled on all Unix-like machines. Only the administration host needs to have Python 3.2 installed.

Chef
Chef is a configuration management tool written in Erlang, and uses a pure Ruby DSL for writing configuration "recipes". These recipes contain resources that should be put into the declared state. Chef can be used as a client–server tool, or used in "solo" mode.

Consfigurator
While Debian and derivatives are the best supported distributions, Consfigurator also work on other distributions and various unixes but they have less support for properties for configuring specific aspects of the system. Consfigurator can set properties to be applied in scheme. This requires Consfigurator to be installed on the target computer. A more restricted language is also available which works without needing Consfigurator to be installed on the target. Remote configuration is also supported: the hosts can be defined with scheme code.

Guix
Guix integrates many things in the same tool (a distribution, package manager, configuration management tool, container environment, etc). To remotely manage systems, it needs the target machines to already run Guix or it can also alternatively deploy configurations inside Digital Ocean Droplet. The machines are configured with Scheme.

ISconf
Tool to execute commands and replicate files on all nodes. The nodes do not need to be up; the commands will be executed when they boot. The system has no central server so commands can be launched from any node and they will replicate to all nodes.

Juju
Juju concentrates on the notion of service, abstracting the notion of machine or server, and defines relations between those services that are automatically updated when two linked services observe a notable modification.

Local Configuration system (LCFG)
LCFG manages the configuration with a central description language in XML, specifying resources, aspects and profiles. Configuration is deployed using the client–server paradigm. Appropriate scripts on clients (called components) transcribe the resources into configuration files and restart services as needed.

Open PC server integration (Opsi)
Opsi is desktop management software for Windows clients based on Linux servers. It provides automatic software deployment (distribution), unattended installation of OS, patch management, hard- and software inventory, license management and software asset management, and administrative tasks for the configuration management.

PIKT
PIKT is foremost a monitoring system that also does configuration management. "PIKT consists of a sophisticated, feature-rich file preprocessor; an innovative scripting language with unique labor-saving features; a flexible, centrally directed process scheduler; a customizing file installer; a collection of powerful command-line extensions; and other useful tools."

Puppet
Puppet consists of a custom declarative language to describe system configuration, distributed using the client–server paradigm (using XML-RPC protocol in older versions, with a recent switch to REST), and a library to realize the configuration. The resource abstraction layer enables administrators to describe the configuration in high-level terms, such as users, services and packages. Puppet will then ensure the server's state matches the description. There was brief support in Puppet for using a pure Ruby DSL as an alternative configuration language starting at version 2.6.0. However this feature was deprecated beginning with version 3.1.

Pyinfra
Pyinfra is an agentless server configuration management tool created in Python. Its execution speed is up to 10 times faster than Ansible. Pyinfra is also excellent for system integration, as it can control SSH connections, Docker, Terraform, Ansible, etc. using a mechanism called a connector. Pyinfra can be run ad hoc or through the API.

Quattor
The quattor information model is based on the distinction between the desired state and the actual state. The desired state is registered in a fabric-wide configuration database, using a specially designed configuration language called Pan for expressing and validating configurations, composed out of reusable hierarchical building blocks called templates. Configurations are propagated to and cached on the managed nodes.

Radmind
Radmind manages hosts configuration at the file system level. In a similar way to Tripwire (and other configuration management tools), it can detect external changes to managed configuration, and can optionally reverse the changes. Radmind does not have higher-level configuration element (services, packages) abstraction. A graphical interface is available (only) for OS X.

Rex
Rex is a remote execution system with integrated configuration management and software deployment capabilities. The admin provides configuration instructions via so-called Rexfiles. They are written in a small DSL but can also contain arbitrary Perl. It integrates well with an automated build system used in CI environments.

Salt
Salt started out as a tool for remote server management. As its usage has grown, it has gained a number of extended features, including a more comprehensive mechanism for host configuration. This is a relatively new feature facilitated through the Salt States component. With the traction that Salt has gotten in the last bit, the support for more features and platforms might continue to grow.

SmartFrog
Java-based tool to deploy and configure applications distributed across multiple machines. There is no central server; you can deploy a .SF configuration file to any node and have it distributed to peer nodes according to the distribution information contained inside the deployment descriptor itself.

Spacewalk
Spacewalk is an open source Linux and Solaris systems management service and is the upstream project for the source of Red Hat Network Satellite. Spacewalk works with RHEL, Fedora, and other RHEL derivative distributions like CentOS, Scientific Linux, etc. There are ongoing efforts on getting it packaged for inclusion in Fedora. Spacewalk provides systems inventory (hardware and software information, installation and updates of software, collection and distribution of custom software packages into manageable groups, provision systems, management and deployment of configuration files, system monitoring, virtual guest provisioning, starting/stopping/configuring virtual guests and delegating all of these actions to local or LDAP users and system entitlements). As of May 2020, Spacewalk is now EOL with users having moved to either Uyuni or Foreman/Katello.

STAF
The Software Testing Automation Framework (STAF) enables users to create cross-platform, distributed software test environments. STAF removes the tedium of building an automation infrastructure, thus enabling users to focus on building their automation service. The STAF framework provides the foundation upon which to build higher-level products, and provides a pluggable approach supported across a large variety of platforms and languages.

Synctool
Synctool aims to be easy to understand, learn and use. It is written in Python and makes use of SSH (passwordless, with host-based or key-based authentication) and rsync. No specific language is needed to configure Synctool. Synctool has dry run capabilities that enable surgical precision.

== See also ==
- List of systems management systems
