= Rudder (software) =

Audit and configuration management utility

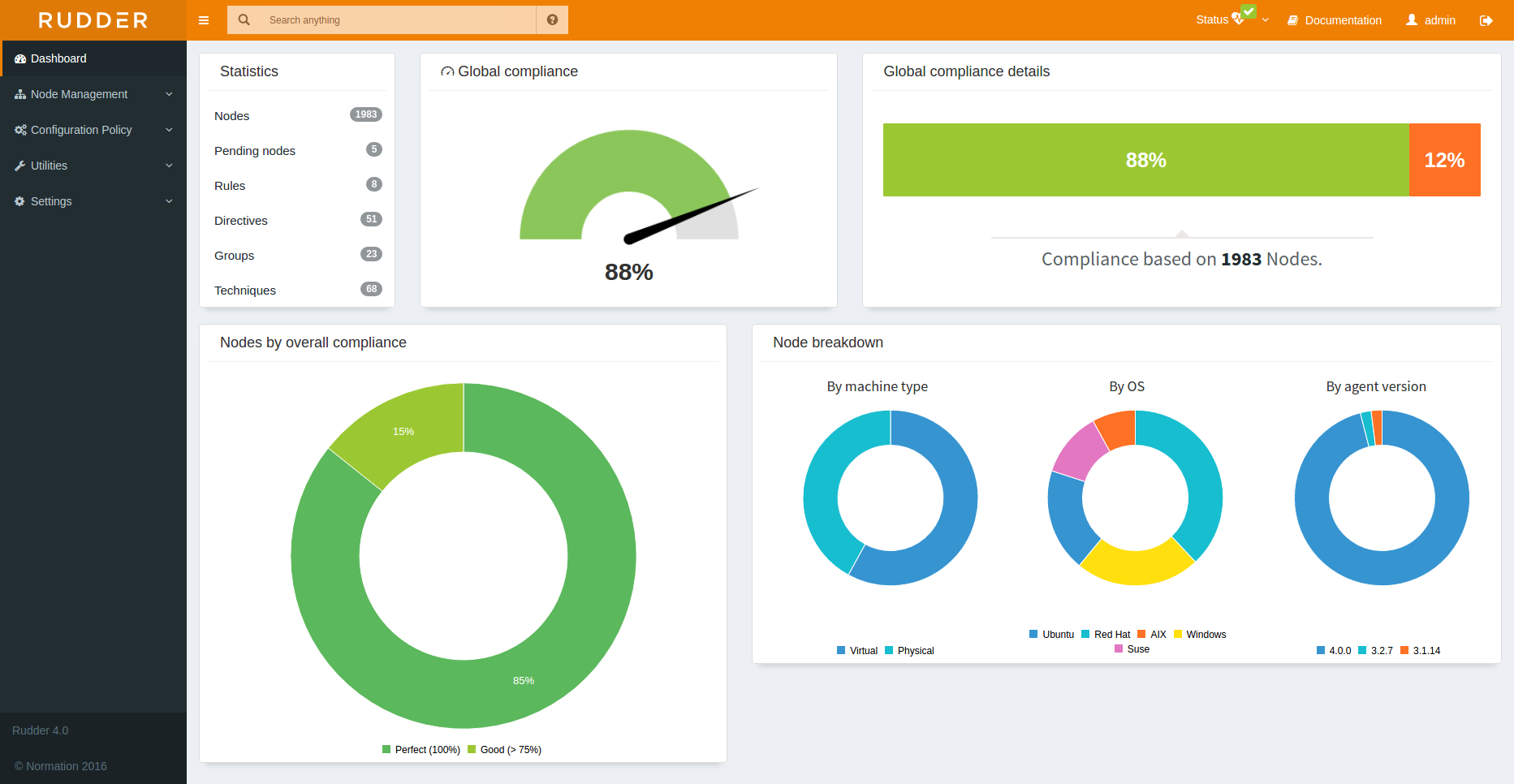
- Screenshot of Rudder 4.0 Dashboard
- Original author: Normation
- Developer: Normation
- Release: October 31, 2011; 14 years ago
- Written in: Scala (server), Rust (server) and C (agent)
- Operating system: Linux, Microsoft Windows
- Type: Configuration management, system administration, network management, cloud management, continuous delivery, DevOps
- License: GNU General Public License and Apache
- Website: www.rudder.io
- Repository: github.com/Normation/rudder

Rudder is an open source audit and configuration management utility to help automate system configuration across large IT infrastructures. Rudder relies on a lightweight local agent installed on each managed machine.

Rudder is produced by Normation, founded in 2010. Its server-side web interface is written in Scala and its local agent is written in C, and are published as free software under the GNU General Public License 3.0.

== Features ==
- Host inventory
- Feature-complete Web interface
- Standardized, reusable policies
- Custom Policy editor
- Central reporting and historic information for policy applied to hosts
- Grouping based on search queries run against inventory
- Automatic updating of such groups (dynamic groups)
- Dynamic generation of per-host policies (lessens risk of data leaks from shared policy)
- Change Request / Validation
- REST API
- Git backend

== History ==
Rudder was created by the founding team of Normation and first released as free software in October 2011.

Rudder 3.0 was released in February 2015.

Latest major version, Rudder 8.0, has been released in November 2023, and Rudder 8.3 has been released in April 2025.

== Platform support ==
The following operating systems are supported for the central Rudder server:

- Debian Linux 11 and 12
- Ubuntu 22.04 LTS and 24.04 LTS
- Red Hat Enterprise Linux (RHEL) and derivatives 8 and 9
- SUSE Linux Enterprise Server (SLES) 15 SP4+
- Amazon Linux 2023

The following operating systems are supported for Rudder Nodes and packages are available for these platforms:

- Debian Linux 10, 11, 12 and 13
- Ubuntu 18.04 LTS, 20.04 LTS, 22.04 LTS and 24.04 LTS
- Red Hat Enterprise Linux (RHEL) and derivatives 7, 8 and 9
- SUSE Linux Enterprise Server (SLES) 12 SP5 and 15 SP2+
- Amazon Linux 2 and 2023
- Slackware 14
- Microsoft Windows Server 2012, 2016, 2019, 2022, Windows 10, Windows 11

== See also ==
- CFEngine
- Ansible (software)
- Bcfg2
- Chef (software)
- Puppet (software)
- Salt (software)
- Comparison of open source configuration management software
- DevOps
