= Software configuration management =

Tracking and controlling software changes

Software configuration management (SCM), a.k.a. software change and configuration management (SCCM), is the software engineering practice of tracking and controlling changes to a software system. It is part of the larger cross-disciplinary field of configuration management (CM). SCM includes version control and the establishment of baselines.

== Goals ==
The goals of SCM include:

- Configuration identification - Identifying configurations, configuration items and baselines.
- Configuration control - Implementing a controlled change process. This is usually achieved by setting up a change control board whose primary function is to approve or reject all change requests that are sent against any baseline.
- Configuration status accounting - Recording and reporting all the necessary information on the status of the development process.
- Configuration auditing - Ensuring that configurations contain all their intended parts and are sound with respect to their specifying documents, including requirements, architectural specifications and user manuals.
- Build management - Managing the process and tools used for builds.
- Process management - Ensuring adherence to the organization's development process.
- Environment management - Managing the software and hardware that host the system.
- Teamwork - Facilitate team interactions related to the process.
- Defect tracking - Making sure every defect has traceability back to the source.

With the introduction of cloud computing and DevOps the purposes of SCM tools have become merged in some cases. The SCM tools themselves have become virtual appliances that can be instantiated as virtual machines and saved with state and version. The tools can model and manage cloud-based virtual resources, including virtual appliances, storage units, and software bundles. The roles and responsibilities of the actors have become merged as well with developers now being able to dynamically instantiate virtual servers and related resources.

== History ==
The history of software configuration management (SCM) can be traced back as early as the 1950s, when CM (configuration management), originally for hardware development and production control, was being applied to software development. Early software had a physical footprint, such as cards, tapes, and other media. The first software configuration management was a manual operation. With the advances in language and complexity, software engineering, involving configuration management and other methods, became a major concern due to issues like schedule, budget, and quality. Practical lessons, over the years, had led to the definition, and establishment, of procedures and tools. Eventually, the tools became systems to manage software changes. Industry-wide practices were offered as solutions, either in an open or proprietary manner (such as Revision Control System). With the growing use of computers, systems emerged that handled a broader scope, including requirements management, design alternatives, quality control, and more; later tools followed the guidelines of organizations, such as the Capability Maturity Model of the Software Engineering Institute.

== Examples ==
- Ansible – Open-source software platform for remote configuring and managing computers
- CFEngine – Configuration management software
- Chef – Configuration management tool
- LCFG – Computer configuration management system
- NixOS – Linux distribution
- OpenMake Software – DevOps company
- Otter
- Puppet – Open source configuration management software
- Salt – Configuration management software
- Rex – Open source software

== See also ==
- Application lifecycle management – Product management of computer programs throughout their development lifecycles
- Comparison of open source configuration management software
- Comparison of version control software
- Continuous configuration automation
- List of revision control software
- Infrastructure as code – Data center management method
