= Capistrano (software) =

- Original authors: Jamis Buck, Lee Hambley
- Stable release: 3.20.1 / 16 May 2026; 5 months ago
- Written in: Ruby
- Operating system: Linux, OpenBSD, macOS
- Type: Deployment tool
- License: MIT License
- Website: capistranorb.com
- Repository: github.com/capistrano/capistrano

Capistrano is an open-source tool for running scripts on multiple servers; its main use is deploying web applications. It automates the process of making a new version of an application available on one or more web servers, including supporting tasks such as changing databases.

Capistrano is written in the Ruby language and is distributed using the RubyGems distribution channel. It is an outgrowth of the Ruby on Rails web application framework, but it is also used to deploy web applications written using other languages, for example, PHP.

Capistrano is implemented primarily for use on the UNIX shell command line. A user may choose from many Capistrano recipes, e.g. to deploy current changes to the web application or roll back to the previous deployment state.

Originally called SwitchTower, the name was changed to Capistrano in March 2006 due to a trademark conflict. The original author, Jamis Buck, announced on February 24, 2009, that he is no longer the maintainer of the project.

== Internals ==
Capistrano is a utility and framework for executing commands in parallel on multiple remote machines, via SSH. It uses a simple domain-specific language borrowed in part from the tool Rake. It also supports tunnelling connections via some gateway machine to allow operations to be performed behind VPNs and firewalls.

Capistrano was originally designed to simplify and automate deployment of web applications to distributed environments, and originally came bundled with a set of tasks designed for deploying Ruby on Rails applications. The deployment tasks are now (as of Capistrano 2.0) opt-in and require clients to explicitly put "load 'deploy'" in their recipes.

== Example Capfile ==
task :xml_libs, :hosts => "www.capify.org" do
  run "ls -x1 /usr/lib | grep -i xml"
end

This defines a single task, called "xml_libs", and says that it should be executed only on the "www.capify.org" host. When executed, it will display all files and subdirectories in /usr/lib that include the text "xml" in their name. Assuming the capfile is in the current directory, the user would execute that task like this:

cap xml_libs

== See also ==
- Ansible
- Chef
- Harrow
- Salt
- Puppet
- Tsshbatch
- Comparison of open source configuration management software
