= Capistrano (disambiguation) =

Capistrano may refer to:

== People ==
- Saint John of Capistrano (San Giovanni da Capistrano, 1386–1456) was Franciscan friar, famous as a preacher, inquisitor, and crusader.
- Capistrano de Abreu (1853–1927), a Brazilian historian

== Places ==
- Capestrano, Abruzzo, central Italy, the saint's birthplace
- Capistrano, Calabria, a municipality in southern Italy
- Capistrano, Ceará, a municipality in Brazil
- San Juan Capistrano, California, a city
  - Mission San Juan Capistrano, a historic mission in California
  - Mission Basilica San Juan Capistrano, the present-day church and parish
- Mission San Juan Capistrano (Texas)

== Other ==
- Warrior of Capestrano, statue found in the Abruzzo village
- Capistrano (software), a software deployment script
- USNS Mission Capistrano (T-AO-112), a WW2 oil tanker
- When the Swallows Come Back to Capistrano, a song
