= SmartFrog =

- Developers: HP Labs in Bristol, England
- Release: January 24, 2004; 22 years ago
- Stable release: 3.18.016 / March 13, 2012; 14 years ago
- Written in: Java
- Platform: Linux, Microsoft Windows XP SP2, Microsoft Windows Vista, HP-UX, Mac OS/X
- Type: Configuration management, Framework
- License: Apache License 2.0
- Website: www.smartfrog.org
- Repository: sourceforge.net/projects/smartfrog/

SmartFrog (Smart Framework for Object Groups) is a Java based open-source framework for helping host large-scale applications across component-based distributed system. It is proposed to make the design, configuration, deployment and management of distributed systems easier, correct and automatic. SmartFrog mainly consists of three aspects: SmartFrog Language, a runtime system, and a library of SmartFrog components that implement the SmartFrog component model.

== History ==
SmartFrog was originally developed in Hewlett-Packard's European Research Labs. It has been used in HP research on infrastructure automation and service automation as well as in a variety of HP products. SmartFrog became open to public in January 2004 under GNU Lesser General Public License (LGPL) licence hosted on SourceForge. As a result, users and developers outside the lab can also make their contributions by using, extending the framework or reporting bugs. In 2017, following Hewlett-Packard's corporate split into HP Inc. and Hewlett Packard Enterprise, whilst under Hewlett Packard Enterprise's ownership, SmartFrog was relicensed under the Apache License 2.0.

== Technologies ==
=== SmartFrog Language ===
SmartFrog Language is a configuration description language used for describing component collections and system configurations, such as which software components belong to the system, what the configuration parameters are, how the components are bound to other components in the system, and in what sequence the components work.

=== Component model ===
In SmartFrog, component is the most important and basic part. A system is considered to be a collection of applications, each of which are composed by a collection of components. Every component is written in a SmartFrog file in Java, which represents the existence and default attributes of components.

=== Runtime system ===
The runtime system interprets the descriptions written in SmartFrog Language and manages the components based on the interpretation results. It also provides users with tools to interact with components.

== Features ==
=== As a framework ===
Instead of a package or library, SmartFrog is a framework, a building block to help build software systems. SmartFrog can be extended by adding new components into the framework, which means it has much wider applicability and could acquire new functionality.

=== Template mechanism ===
In SmartFrog, every component is defined as a template. Typically for every new service, new components are created and activated. However, some general purpose components can be reused in different service. For the template mechanism, system configuration is easy to adapt to different requirements and the default configuration can be kept. Prototyping also allows keeping all the transformation and history of configurations of the system. Using SmartFrog to build large-scale distributed system, one can reuse some components and does not need to completely rewrite the whole application. Users can easily write or create simple SmartFrog components to install, uninstall, configure, start, and stop the system using the configuration description notation.

=== Cross-client model ===
There are many software system similar to SmartFrog, but few of them uses the same model as what is used in SmartFrog. The largest category of systems is based on client-server model, where the configuration data for all clients are held in a server and each client is designed to match the configuration data stored in the server. However, in SmartFrog, cross-client model is used so that each client is treated as an independent entity. This provides SmartFrog with the ability to coordinate across large range of nodes, carry out autonomic actions and result in higher scalability.

== Security ==
SmartFrog has two running modes: secure and insecure. In insecure mode, there is no restriction on client connection to SmartFrog, and the plain-text communication can be eavesdropped and intercepted. In this mode, the system is vulnerable to malign attacks.

SmartFrog needs to protect against malign deployment or other management action. In secure mode, SmartFrog uses public key infrastructure (PKI) system. Only clients that are certificated by specified certificate authority (CA) can connect to the SmartFrog Daemon. In addition, SmartFrog signs all components and descriptions with a certificate and only the signed ones can be deployed. Communications are encrypted using Transport Layer Security (TLS) protocols.

== Related projects ==
=== The GridWeaver Project ===
The GridWeaver project started at 2002 and lasted a year. The project collaborators were the School of Informatics of Edinburgh University, HP Laboratories, and Edinburgh Parallel Computing Centre (EPCC).This project was aimed to find solutions to the problems of automating the configuration and management of the next generation of Grid computing fabrics.

The project compared SmartFrog and Local ConFiGuration system (LCFG) in terms of strengths and weaknesses, as well as investigating how these tools are utilized to solve problems.

=== SFJS ===
SFJS is a configuration language, runtime and component library developed by Configured Things, a company co-founded by Patrick Goldsack, one of the SmartFrog project's lead authors. SFJS is a spiritual successor to SmartFrog, built on Node.js.

== See also ==
- Comparison of open source configuration management software
- LCFG - an established configuration framework for managing large numbers of systems
