= System Configuration =

- For system configuration in general see System configuration.
- For the Microsoft Windows System Configuration utility see MSConfig.
