= NOC (software) =

- Other names: NOC Project
- Original authors: Dmitry Volodin, Dmitry Lukhtionov, Ilya Shilov, Alexey Shirokikh, Dmitry Roschin, Alexey Shapovalov
- Initial release: 2007
- Stable release: 22.2 / October 14, 2022; 3 years ago
- Repository: code.getnoc.com/noc/noc
- Written in: Python
- Operating system: Linux, FreeBSD, macOS, Solaris
- Platform: x86-64
- Size: 65.5 MB
- Available in: 3 languages
- List of languages English, Portuguese, Russian
- Type: Operations support system
- License: New BSD license
- Website: kb.nocproject.org

NOC is an open-source operations support system for telecommunications service providers. It can maintain network inventory, manage virtual circuits, maintain distributed DNS configuration and manage IP address blocks.

NOC Project is mentioned in the Configuration management and backup tools section of the 2019 GEANT SIG-NOC Tools Survey among other tools used by the community.

== See also ==
- Comparison of open-source configuration management software
- Infrastructure as code (IaC)
- Infrastructure as Code Tools
