= Radmind =

Remote administration software

- Developer: Research Systems Unix Group at the University of Michigan
- Stable release: 1.14.1 / December 13, 2010
- Operating system: UNIX, Mac OS X, and Microsoft Windows
- Type: Security (tripwire), file management
- Website: At U. Mich, at GitHub, at Sourceforge
- Repository: github.com/Radmind/radmind

Radmind is a suite of Unix command-line tools and an application server designed to remotely administer the file systems of multiple client machines.

For Mac OS X, there is a graphical user interface called Radmind Assistant, as well as a GUI for the Radmind server called Radmind Server Manager.

Radmind was the 2003 Apple Design Awards runner-up for Best Mac OS X Server Solution.

Radmind is developed by the Research Systems Unix Group at the University of Michigan.

== How Radmind Works ==
Radmind operates as a tripwire, detecting changes in a client's filesystem (and, in the case of Microsoft Windows, the registry) and reversing the changes. Radmind stores filesystem specifications in text files called transcripts, signified with a .T extension. Transcripts are referenced from command files, signified with a .K extension, which specify which transcripts (and with what precedence) should be applied to a client machine's filesystem.

== Suite of tools ==
The radmind suite of tools comprises

- ktcheck, which updates the locally stored command files and transcripts to match those on the server.
- fsdiff, which checks the client filesystem against the transcripts on the local system without using network bandwidth.
- lapply, which updates the client filesystem to match the transcripts, downloading files as needed.
- lcreate, which uploads new transcripts to the server.
- lcksum, which verifies uploaded transcripts.
- lfdiff, which compares local files with copies on Radmind server.
- lmerge, which combines transcripts on the server.
- ra.sh , which automates the update process using ktcheck, fsdiff, and lapply.
- twhich, which returns which transcript(s) a file is referenced in.
- applefile, which allows Radmind to work with AppleSingle files.
