= TeamQuest Corporation =

Software developer

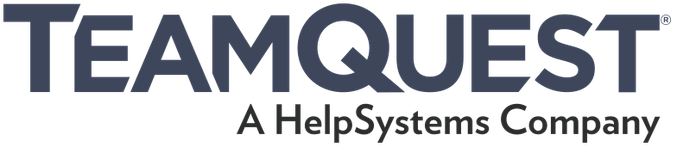
- Type: Private
- Industry: Information technology management
- Founded: 1991 as TeamQuest Corporation
- Headquarters: 6455 City West Parkway; Eden Prairie, MN
- Parent: HelpSystems
- Website: https://www.helpsystems.com/product-lines/teamquest

TeamQuest Corporation is a computer software company specializing in Systems management, Performance management and Capacity planning software for computer servers. TeamQuest is headquartered in Eden Prairie, Minnesota. In 2016, shortly after lay-offs "due to a decline in the company's software development for mainframe structures", the company was acquired by HelpSystems.

== History ==
TeamQuest was founded in 1991 by three employees from a software research and development group at Unisys Corporation.

== Solutions ==
TeamQuest solutions are focused on IT Service Optimization (ITSO). The stated goal of ITSO is to "meet IT service levels while minimizing infrastructure costs and mitigating risks", for example through server consolidation.

TeamQuest released a comprehensive update to its Vityl suite of infrastructure monitoring and capacity management tools in January 2017.

== Customers ==
TeamQuest customers include companies across a variety of industries.

== See also ==
- BigAdmin Feature Article: Using TeamQuest Performance Software to Monitor Zones for Performance Management of the Solaris OS
- Business Profile on Yahoo Finance : Teamquest Corporation
