= Software Testing Automation Framework =

Software Testing Automation Framework (STAF)
- Developer: IBM
- Initial release: Initial Release in 1998. Version 3.0 initial release in 2005.
- Written in: Core application: C++. Public APIs available in Java, C, C++, Python, Perl, Tcl, Rexx.
- Operating system: Cross-platform
- Available in: English
- Type: Test Automation Framework
- License: As of v3.2.5, STAF uses the Eclipse Public License V1.0. Additional details here .
- Website: Software Testing Automation Framework (STAF)

The Software Testing Automation Framework (STAF) is an open-source project licensed under the Eclipse Public License. STAF provides a platform for users to establish cross-platform, distributed software test environments. The design of STAF revolves around the concept of reusable components, known as services. These services include process invocation, resource management, logging and monitoring. STAF aims to streamline the development of automation solutions by offering an automation infrastructure. This framework lays the groundwork for constructing more complex solutions and supports a pluggable approach across a variety of platforms and languages.

== Services ==
STAF incorporates several services that deliver specific functionalities. One of the key services is the STAf eXecution engine, responsible for executing test scripts.

Additional services offer features like cron, file system, inter-process communication, e-mail, and hypertext mark-up support, among others.

Developers are also provided with guidelines to create their own custom services.

== Support ==
Support for STAF is available through comprehensive online documentation and user forums, which can be accessed via the STAF website.
