= Quattor =

Open-source configuration management system

Quattor is a generic open-source tool-kit used to install, configure, and manage computers. Quattor was originally developed in the framework of European DataGrid project (2001-2004). Since its first release in 2003, Quattor has been maintained and extended by a volunteer community of users and developers, primarily from the community of grid system administrators. The Quattor tool-kit, like other configuration management systems, reduces the staff required to maintain a cluster and facilitates reliable change management. However, three unique features make it particularly attractive for managing grid resources:

- Federated Management: The open, modular nature of the tool-kit permits system administrators at different institutes to share the management of their distributed resources.
- Shared Configuration and Management Efficiency: Quattor encourages the re-use of configuration information in such a way that it can be distributed and used with little or no modification at different sites, facilitating the distribution of best practices without the need for each site to implement configuration changes.
- Coherent Site Model: Quattor allows an administrator to develop a site model that, once constructed, can be used to manage a range of different resources, such as real machines, virtual machines and cloud resources.

These features are also attractive beyond the grid context. This has been confirmed by the growing adoption of Quattor, by both large commercial organisations and academic institutions, most of them using the tool-kit to manage consistently their grid and non-grid systems.

== Principles ==
The challenge of structuring and sharing components in a collaborative system is not new; over the years programming language designers have attacked this problem from many angles. While trends change, the basic principles are well understood. Features such as encapsulation, abstraction, modularity, and typing produce clear benefits. We believe that similar principles apply when sharing configuration information across administrative domains.

The Quattor configuration tool-kit derives its architecture from LCFG, improving it in several aspects. At the core of Quattor is Pan, a high-level, typed language with flexible include mechanisms, a range of data structures, and validation features familiar to modern programmers. Pan allows collaborative administrators to build up a complex set of configuration templates describing service types, hardware components, configuration parameters, users etc. The use of a high-level language facilitates code reuse in a way that goes beyond cut-and-paste of configuration snippets.

The principles embodied in Quattor are in line with those established within the system administration community. In particular, all managed nodes retrieve their configurations from a configuration server backed by a source-control system (or systems in the case of devolved management). This allows individual nodes to be recreated in the case of hardware failure. Quattor handles both distributed and traditional (single-site) infrastructures.

Devolved management includes the following features: consistency over a multi-site infrastructure, multiple management points, and the ability to accommodate the specific needs of constituent sites. There is no single “correct” model for a devolved infrastructure, thus great flexibility is needed in the architecture of the configuration system itself. Sometimes a set of highly autonomous sites wish to collaborate loosely. In this case each site will host a fairly comprehensive set of configuration servers, with common configuration information being retrieved from a shared database and integrated with the local configuration.

Distributing the management task can potentially introduce new costs. For example, transmitting configuration information over the WAN introduces latency and security concerns. Quattor allows servers to be placed at appropriate locations in the infrastructure to reduce latency, and the use of standard tools and protocols means that existing security systems (such as a public key infrastructure) can be harnessed to encrypt and authenticate communications.

== Quattor Architecture ==
=== Configuration management system ===
Quattor's configuration management system is composed of a configuration database that stores high-level configuration templates, the Pan compiler that validates templates and translates them to XML or JSON profiles, and a machine profile repository that serves the profiles to client nodes. Only the Pan compiler is strictly necessary in a Quattor system; the other two subsystems can be replaced by any service providing similar functionality.

Devolved management in a cross-domain environment requires users to be authenticated and their operations to be authorized. For the configuration database X.509 certificates can be used because of the support offered by many standard tools, and access control lists (ACLs) because they allow a fine-grained control (an ACL can be attached to each template). When many users interact with the system, conflicts and misconfiguration may arise which require a rollback mechanism; to this purpose, a simple concurrent transaction mechanism, based on standard version control systems, was implemented.

Quattor's modular architecture allows the three configuration management subsystems to be deployed in either a distributed or centralized fashion. In the distributed approach, profile compilation (at development stage) is carried out on client systems, templates are then checked into a suitable database, and finally the deployment is initiated by invoking a separate operation on the server. The centralized approach provides strict control of configuration data. The compilation burden is placed onto the central server, and users can only access and modify templates via a dedicated interface.

Since the two paradigms provide essentially the same functionality, the choice between them depends on which fits the management model of an organization better. For instance, the centralized approach fits large computer centres well because of its strictly controlled work-flow, whereas multi-site organizations such as GRIF prefer the distributed approach because it allows different parts of the whole configuration set to be handled autonomously.

=== Pan language ===
The Pan language compiler panc sits at the core of the Quattor tool-kit. It compiles machine configurations written in the Pan configuration language by system administrators and produces XML or JSON files (profiles) that are easily consumed by Quattor clients. The Pan language itself has a simple, declarative syntax that allows simultaneous definition of configuration information and an associated schema. In this section, we focus only on the Pan features that are relevant to devolved management of distributed sites: validation, configuration reuse, and modularization.

Validation. The extensive validation features in the Pan language maximize the probability of finding configuration problems at compile time, minimizing costly clean-ups of deployed misconfiguration. Pan enables system administrators to define atomic or compound types with associated validation functions; when a part of the configuration schema is bound to a type, the declared constraints are automatically enforced.

Configuration reuse. Pan allows identification and reuse of configuration information through “structure templates.” These identify small, reusable chunks of Pan-level configuration information which can be used whenever an administrator identifies an invariant (or nearly invariant) configuration sub-tree.

Modularization. With respect to the original design, two new features have been developed to promote modularization and large-scale reuse of configurations: the name-spacing and load-path mechanisms.

A full site configuration typically consists of a large number of templates organized into directories and subdirectories. The Pan template name-spacing mimics (and enforces) this organization much as is done in the Java language. The name-space hierarchy is independent of the configuration schema. The configuration schema is often organized by low-level services such as firewall settings for ports, account generation, log rotation entries, cron entries, and the like. In contrast, the Pan templates are usually organized based on other criteria like high-level services (web server, mail server, etc.) or by responsible person/group.

The name-spacing allows various parts of the configuration to be separated and identified. To effectively modularize part of the configuration for reuse, administrators must be able to import the modules easily into a site's configuration and to customize them. Users of the Pan compiler combine a load-path with the name-spacing to achieve this. The compiler uses the load-path to search multiple root directories for particular, named templates; the first version found on the load-path is the one that is used by the compiler. This allows modules to be kept in a pristine state while allowing sites to override any particular template.

Further, module developers can also expose global variables to parameterize the module, permitting a system administrator to use a module without having to understand the inner workings of the module's templates.

Quattor Working Group (QWG) templates are used to configure grid middleware services. The QWG templates use all of the features of Pan to allow distributed sites to share grid middleware expertise.

=== Automated installation management ===
A key feature for administering large distributed infrastructures is the ability to automatically install machines, possibly from a remote location. To this purpose, Quattor provides a modular framework called the Automated Installation Infrastructure (AII). This framework is responsible for translating the configuration parameters embodied in node profiles into installation instructions suitable for use by standard installation tools. Current AII modules use node profiles to configure DHCP servers, PXE boot and Kickstart-guided installations.

Normally AII is set up with an install server at each site. However, the above-mentioned technologies allow the transparent implementation of multi-site installations, by setting up a central server and appropriate relays using standard protocols.

=== Node configuration management ===
In Quattor, managed nodes handle their configuration process autonomously; all actions are initiated locally, once the configuration profile has been retrieved from the repository. Each node has a set of configuration agents (components) that are each registered with a particular part of the configuration schema. For example, the component that manages user accounts is registered with the path /software/components/accounts. A dispatcher program running on the node performs an analysis of the freshly retrieved configuration for changes in the relevant sections, and triggers the appropriate components. Run-time dependencies may be expressed in the node's profile, so that a partial order can be enforced on component execution. For example, it is important that the user accounts component runs before the file creation component, to ensure that file ownership can be correctly specified.

By design, no control loop is provided for ensuring the correct execution of configuration components. Site administrators typically use standard monitoring systems to detect and respond to configuration failures. Nagios and Lemon are both being used at Quattor sites for this purpose. In fact, Lemon has been developed in tandem with Quattor, and provides sensors to detect failures in Quattor component execution.

While nodes normally update themselves automatically, administrators can configure the system to disable automatic change deployment. This is crucial in a devolved system where the responsibilities for, respectively, modifying and deploying the configuration may be separated. A typical scenario is that top-level administrators manage the shared configuration of multiple remote sites and local managers apply it according to their policies. For instance, software updates might be scheduled at different times.

== See also ==
- Comparison of open source configuration management software
