= Rex (software) =

Open source software

(R)?ex
- Developers: Jan Gehring, Ferenc Erki
- Initial release: 5 November 2010
- Stable release: 1.16.1 / 5 July 2025; 11 months ago
- Written in: Perl
- Operating system: Linux, Unix-like, Windows
- Type: Configuration management
- License: Apache
- Website: rexify.org
- Repository: github.com/RexOps/Rex

(R)?ex or simply Rex is an open source remote execution, configuration management and software deployment tool. It combines Perl and Secure Shell (SSH) for a portable, centralistic approach to its problem domain.

Rex is an acronym for "Remote Execution".

== History ==
Rex originated from the need of a flexible, parallel remote execution application with software deployment and configuration management capabilities. Unsatisfied with available implementations in 2010, the author of Rex, Jan Gehring, decided to implement a Perl-based tool to cope with his requirements.

== Design ==
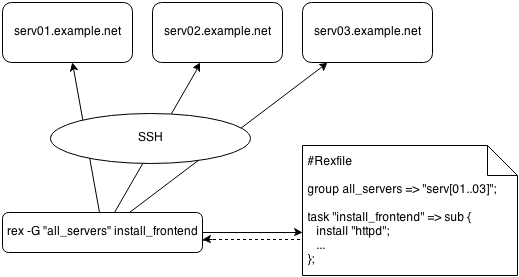
Rex is executed on the command line. Required parameters are fetched from the local Rexfile. The task logic is executed on the local host. The single commands of the specified task are executed atomically on every server. Rex may connect and execute commands in sequence or in parallel depending on the number of threads used.

Rex is a stand-alone application executing either a single command or so-called tasks. Tasks are specified on the command line and are defined in Rexfiles. A Rexfile takes a similar role for remote execution as a Makefile does for application installation. It is defined via a small DSL, but is essentially a Perl script. Therefore, it can contain arbitrary Perl as well.

For code reuse, configuration instructions are placed in modules which can be included by a Rexfile. A template system for configuration files is available.

For Rex to be able to work, the managed targets must provide a running SSH server and a Perl 5 interpreter.

Rex serves a variety of applications. Examples are user & group, cron, filesystem, kernel module, process and virtual machine management.

== Public recognition ==
Rex is discussed on conferences and in related press releases.

It was voted under the Best Open Source solutions 2013 by Initiative Mittelstand.

== See also ==
- Comparison of open-source configuration management software
- Infrastructure as code (IaC)
- Infrastructure as Code Tools
