= Bcfg2 =

Configuration management software

- Developer(s): Narayan Desai et al.
- Initial release: 11 August 2004; 20 years ago
- Stable release: 1.3.6 / 11 June 2015; 9 years ago
- Preview release: 1.4.0pre2 / 13 November 2015; 9 years ago
- Written in: Python
- Operating system: Cross-platform
- Platform: Unix, Linux
- Type: Configuration management, System administration, Network management
- License: BSD 2-clause
- Website: bcfg2.org

Bcfg2 (pronounced "bee-config") is a configuration management tool developed in the Mathematics and Computer Science Division of Argonne National Laboratory. Bcfg2 aids in the infrastructure management lifecycle – configuration analysis, service deployment, and configuration auditing. It includes tools for visualizing configuration information, as well as reporting tools that help administrators understand configuration patterns in their environments.

Bcfg2 differs from similar configuration management tools due to its auditing capability. One of the stated design goals for Bcfg2 is to determine if interactive (direct) changes have been made to a machine and report on these extra changes. The client can optionally remove any additional configuration.

== Overview ==
Bcfg2 is written in Python and enables system administrator to manage the configuration of a large number of computers using a central configuration model. Bcfg2 operates using a simple model of system configuration, modeling intuitive items like packages, services and configuration files (as well as the dependencies between them). This model of system configuration is used for verification and validation, allowing robust auditing of deployed systems. The Bcfg2 configuration specification is written using a declarative XML model. The entire specification can be validated using widely available XML schema validators along with the custom schemas included in Bcfg2.

Built to be cross-platform, Bcfg2 works on most Unix-like operating systems.

== Architecture ==
Bcfg2 is based on a client-server architecture. The client is responsible for interpreting (but not processing) the configuration served by the server. This configuration is literal, so no client-side processing of the configuration is required. After completion of the configuration process, the client uploads a set of statistics to the server.

=== The Bcfg2 Client ===
The Bcfg2 client performs all client configuration or reconfiguration operations. It renders a declarative configuration specification, provided by the Bcfg2 server, into a set of configuration operations which will attempt to change the client's state into that described by the configuration specification.

The operation of the Bcfg2 client is intended to be as simple as possible. Conceptually, the sole purpose of the client is to reconcile the differences between the current client state and the state described in the specification received from the Bcfg2 server.

=== The Bcfg2 Server ===
The Bcfg2 server is responsible for taking a network description and turning it into a series of configuration specifications for particular clients. It also manages probed data and tracks statistics for clients.

==== Server operation ====
The Bcfg2 server takes information from two sources when generating client configuration specifications. The first is a pool of metadata that describes clients as members of an aspect-based classing system. That is, clients are defined in terms of aspects of their abstract behavior. The other is a file system repository that contains mappings from metadata to literal configuration. These are combined to form the literal configuration specifications for clients.

An example of abstract configuration entries:

<Package name="openssh-server"/>
<Path name="/etc/motd"/>

An example of literal configuration entries:

<Package name="openssh-server" version="auto" type="deb"/>
<Path name="/etc/motd">Hello from Bcfg2
</Path>

== See also ==
- Comparison of open source configuration management software
- Puppet
- OpenLMI
