= Capistrano, Ceará =

Municipality in Ceará, Brazil

Coordinates: 4°28′S 38°55′W

Capistrano
- Municipality
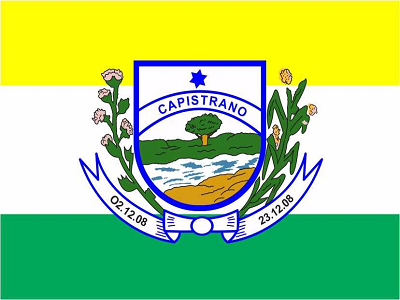
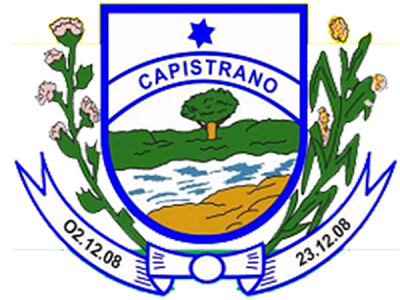
- Flag Coat of arms
- Interactive map of Capistrano
- Country: Brazil
- Region: Nordeste
- State: Ceará
- Mesoregion: Noroeste Cearense

Population (2020)
  - Total: 17,786
- Time zone: UTC−3 (BRT)

Capistrano, Ceará is a municipality in the state of Ceará in the Northeast region of Brazil.

== See also ==
- List of municipalities in Ceará
