= Service Design Package (ITIL) =

The Service Design Package (SDP) contains the core documentation of a service and is attached to its entry in the ITIL Service Portfolio.

The SDP is described in the book Service Design, one of the five books that comprises the core of ITIL.

The SDP follows the lifecycle of a service from when it is first suggested as a possibility to when it is finally retired. It is the central reference point for all documentation of a service, so it contains many links to other documents.

A description of the sort of information that should be kept in an SDP is found in Appendix A of the Service Design book.

The main categories described are:

- Service lifecycle plan
- Service programme
- Service transition plan
- Service operational acceptance plan
- Overall operational strategy, objectives, policy, risk assessment and plans
- Service acceptance criteria

At major stages through the life of a service, the "Service Design Package (SDP)"' will contain project plans, project progress and project outcomes, as well as the business case that justified the service or the transition of the service from one status to another.

== Definition of a 'Service' ==
In the ITIL model, a 'Service' is defined as, "A means of delivering value to customers by facilitating outcomes customers want to achieve without the ownership of specific costs and risks." The meaning is thus highly business-focused and assumes some degree of outsourcing, although this may just be outsourcing from within the functional business unit to some IT services group within the same overall business.

'Service' in this context should not be confused with the IT meanings of 'service', such as a web service. This is somewhat confused by ITIL also recommending the adoption of service-oriented architecture, as expounded by OASIS. In most technical contexts, SOA is widely assumed to imply the provision and interconnection of technical services. Although a fashionable buzzword for ITIL to have incorporated, they do not use the term according to its general meaning.

== See also ==
- Application Services Library – A similar framework for Application Management
- Business Information Services Library (BiSL) – A similar framework for Information Management and Functional Management
- Granular configuration automation
- ITIL The Service Management Framework
- ISO/IEC 20000 – An international standard for IT service management
- Muda - In a Lean framework, most of ITIL would be seen as Type I Muda: unavoidable, but not value-added work.
- Performance engineering
- RPR problem diagnosis
- Tudor IT Process Assessment – A framework for assessment of IT service management maturity

== Bibliography ==
- ITIL Service Design. The Stationery Office. 2011. ISBN 9780113313051.
