= Service Portfolio (ITIL) =

The Service Portfolio is described in the ITIL books Service Strategy and Service Design. The Service Portfolio is the core repository for all information for all services in an organization. Each service is listed along with its current status and history. The main descriptor in the Service Portfolio is the Service Design Package (SDP).

The Service Portfolio consists of three parts:

Service Pipeline

This contains references to services that are not yet live. They may be proposed, or under development. Those might be new services or modifications in the existing ones, coming from the Strategy phase and ready for the Operation phase.

Service Catalogue

This contains links to active services through their Service Design Package

Retired Services

Services in the process of being discontinued, before they are finally decommissioned

Of these three, only the Service Catalogue is visible to the customers and support team. Customers are excluded from the pipeline provisioning process for services under development.

== See also ==
- Application Services Library – A similar framework for Application Management
- Business Information Services Library (BiSL) – A similar framework for Information Management and Functional Management
- Granular configuration automation
- ITIL The Service Management Framework
- Service Design Package SDP
- ISO/IEC 20000 – An international standard for IT service management
- Tudor IT Process Assessment – A framework for assessment of IT service management maturity
- Performance engineering
- RPR problem diagnosis

== Bibliography ==
- ITIL Service Design. The Stationery Office. 2011. ISBN 9780113313051.
