= Documentation =

Set of documents providing knowledge to explain a system

Documentation is any communicable material that is used to describe, explain, or instruct regarding some attributes of an object, system, or procedure, such as its parts, assembly, installation, maintenance, and use. As a form of knowledge management and knowledge organization, documentation can be provided on paper, online, or on digital or analog media, such as audio tape or CDs. Examples of such resources include user guides, white papers, online help, and quick-reference guides. Paper or hard-copy documentation has become less common. Contemporary documentation is often distributed through websites, software products, and other online applications.

Documentation, understood as a set of instructional materials, should not be confused with documentation science, which is the study of the recording and retrieval of information.

== Principles for producing documentation ==
Ex

1. While associated International Organization for Standardization (ISO) standards are not easily available publicly, a guide from other sources for this topic may serve the purpose.

Documentation development may involve document drafting, formatting, submitting, reviewing, approving, distributing, reposting and tracking, etc., and are convened by associated standard operating procedure in a regulatory industry. It could also involve creating content from scratch. Documentation should be easy to read and understand. If it is too long and too wordy, it may be misunderstood or ignored. Clear, concise words should be used, and sentences should be limited to a maximum of 15 words. Documentation intended for a general audience should avoid gender-specific terms and cultural biases. In a series of procedures, steps should be clearly numbered.

== Producing documentation ==
Technical writers and corporate communicators are professionals whose field and work is documentation. Ideally, technical writers have a background in both the subject matter and also in writing, managing content, and information architecture. Technical writers more commonly collaborate with subject-matter experts, such as engineers, technical experts, medical professionals, etc. to define and then create documentation to meet the user's needs. Corporate communications includes other types of written documentation, for example:

- Market communications (MarCom): MarCom writers endeavor to convey the company's value proposition through a variety of print, electronic, and social media. This area of corporate writing is often engaged in responding to proposals.
- Technical communication (TechCom): Technical writers document a company's product or service. Technical publications can include user guides, installation and configuration manuals, and troubleshooting and repair procedures.
- Legal writing: This type of documentation is often prepared by attorneys or paralegals.
- Compliance documentation: This type of documentation codifies standard operating procedures, for any regulatory compliance needs, as for safety approval, taxation, financing, and technical approval.
- Healthcare documentation: This field of documentation encompasses the timely recording and validation of events that have occurred during the course of providing health care.

== Documentation in computer science ==
=== Types ===
The following are typical software documentation types:

- Request for proposal
- Requirements/statement of work/scope of work
- Software design and functional specification
- System design and functional specifications
- Change management, error and enhancement tracking
- User acceptance testing
- Manpages

The following are typical hardware and service documentation types:

- Network diagrams
- Network maps
- Datasheet for IT systems (server, switch, e.g.)
- Service catalog and service portfolio (Information Technology Infrastructure Library)

=== Software Documentation Folder (SDF) tool ===
A common type of software document written in the simulation industry is the SDF. When developing software for a simulator, which can range from embedded avionics devices to 3D terrain databases by way of full motion control systems, the engineer keeps a notebook detailing the development "the build" of the project or module. The document can be a wiki page, Microsoft Word document or other environment. They should contain a requirements section, an interface section to detail the communication interface of the software. Often a notes section is used to detail the proof of concept, and then track errors and enhancements. Finally, a testing section to document how the software was tested. This documents conformance to the client's requirements. The result is a detailed description of how the software is designed, how to build and install the software on the target device, and any known defects and workarounds. This build document enables future developers and maintainers to come up to speed on the software in a timely manner, and also provides a roadmap to modifying code or searching for bugs.

=== Software tools for network inventory and configuration ===
These software tools can automatically collect data of your network equipment. The data could be for inventory and for configuration information. The Information Technology Infrastructure Library requests to create such a database as a basis for all information for the IT responsible. It is also the basis for IT documentation. Examples include XIA Configuration.

== Documentation in criminal justice ==
"Documentation" is the preferred term for the process of populating criminal databases. Examples include the National Counterterrorism Center's Terrorist Identities Datamart Environment, sex offender registries, and gang databases.

== Documentation in early childhood education ==
Documentation, as it pertains to the early childhood education field, is "when we notice and value children's ideas, thinking, questions, and theories about the world and then collect traces of their work (drawings, photographs of the children in action, and transcripts of their words) to share with a wider community". Thus, documentation is a process, used to link the educator's knowledge and learning of the child/children with the families, other collaborators, and even to the children themselves. Documentation is an integral part of the cycle of inquiry - observing, reflecting, documenting, sharing and responding. Pedagogical documentation, in terms of the teacher documentation, is the "teacher's story of the movement in children's understanding". According to Stephanie Cox Suarez in "Documentation - Transforming our Perspectives", "teachers are considered researchers, and documentation is a research tool to support knowledge building among children and adults".

Documentation can take many different styles in the classroom. The following exemplifies ways in which documentation can make the research, or learning, visible:

1. Documentation panels (bulletin-board-like presentation with multiple pictures and descriptions about the project or event).
2. Daily log (a log kept every day that records the play and learning in the classroom)
3. Documentation developed by or with the children (when observing children during documentation, the child's lens of the observation is used in the actual documentation)
4. Individual portfolios (documentation used to track and highlight the development of each child)
5. Electronic documentation (using apps and devices to share documentation with families and collaborators)
6. Transcripts or recordings of conversations (using recording in documentation can bring about deeper reflections for both the educator and the child)
7. Learning stories (a narrative used to "describe learning and help children see themselves as powerful learners")
8. The classroom as documentation (reflections and documentation of the physical environment of a classroom).

Documentation is certainly a process in and of itself, and it is also a process within the educator. The following is the development of documentation as it progresses for and in the educator themselves:

- Develop(s) habits of documentation
- Become(s) comfortable with going public with recounting of activities
- Develop(s) visual literacy skills
- Conceptualize(s) the purpose of documentation as making learning styles visible, and
- Share(s) visible theories for interpretation purposes and further design of curriculum.

== See also ==
- Authoring
- Bibliographic control
- Change control
- Citation Index
- Copyright
- Description
- Document
- Documentation (field)
- Documentation science
- Document identifier
- Document management system
- Documentary
- Freedom of information
- Glossary
- Index (publishing)
- ISO 2384:1977
- ISO 259:1984
- ISO 5123:1984
- ISO 3602:1989
- ISO 6357:1985
- ISO 690
- ISO 5964
- ISO 9001
- IEC 61355
- International Standard Bibliographic Description
- Journal of Documentation
- Licensing
- Letterhead
- List of Contents
- Technical documentation
- User guide
- Medical certificate
- Publishing
- Records management
- Software documentation
- Style guide
- Technical communication
