= Visual CMDB =

An ITIL Visual Configuration Management Database (Visual CMDB) is a series of spreadsheet applications that integrates the CMDB with Change Management and Service Level Management. A Visual CMDB provides a unified view of IT infrastructure in a visual representation. This common view is a cornerstone for implementing a successful Configuration Management process.

A Visual CMDB helps manage IT assets(CIs) such as Hardware, Software and network components and associated details such as data files, documentation and service level information.

The integration of Change Management with a Visual CMDB allows users to do impact assessments for change and to make the correct changes to the infrastructure to keep the CMDB in sync with reality. The Forward Schedule of Change provides additional visual information to help with change impact assessment over time.

== See also ==
- ITIL
- itSMF
- Capability Maturity Model
- ISO 9000
- Total Quality Management
