= FitSM =

FitSM is the name for a family of standards for lightweight IT service management (ITSM).

== Overview and parts ==
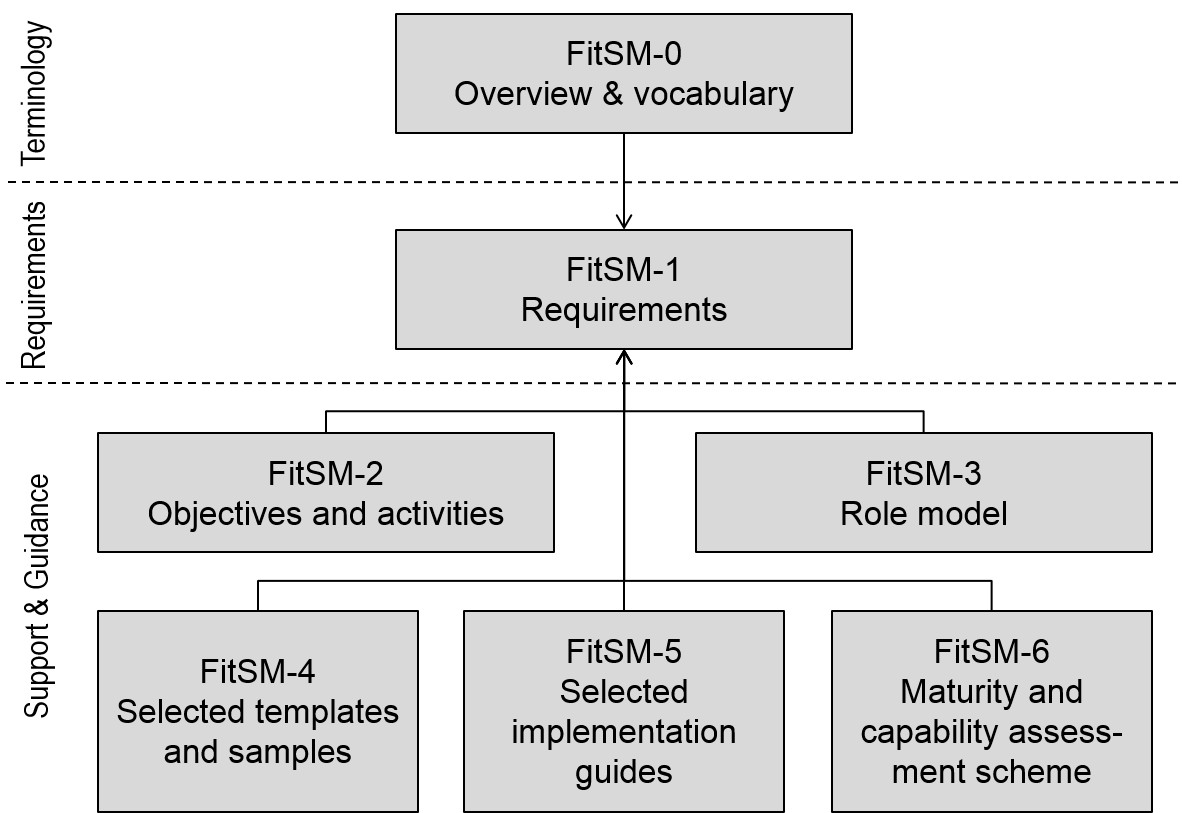
Structure of FitSM parts

FitSM calls itself a standard, but is not published or managed by an established standards organisation like ISO. However, in a way very similar to that of many ISO and ISO/IEC standard families, it structures its documents into several numbered parts and defines requirements for an effective service management system in its part 1.

All parts are published under Creative Common licenses.

=== FitSM-0: Overview and vocabulary ===
A single document containing about 70 definitions of ITSM terms.

=== FitSM-1: Requirements ===
A single document containing about 85 auditable requirements for an effective service management system. The requirements are divided into general requirements (GR) and requirements for 14 different service management processes (PR). FitSM is similar in scope and style to part 1 of ISO/IEC 20000, but significantly shorter.

=== FitSM-2: Objectives and activities ===
A single document containing a description of the goal of each process defined in FitSM-1, as well as a description of activities to initially set up the process and ongoing process activities.

=== FitSM-3: Role model ===
A single document containing descriptions of generic service management system and service management process roles.

=== FitSM-4: Templates and samples ===
A collection of templates and samples for documents needed in a service management system, e.g. SLAs, statement of a service management policy, elements of a service portfolio or service catalogue etc.

=== FitSM-5: Guides ===
A collection of guides on various ITSM topics.

=== FitSM-6: Maturity assessment ===
An Excel-based tool that uses situation descriptions to aid an easy assessment of the maturity of implemented service management processes and general practices.

== Certification and qualification scheme ==
While conformance to FitSM-1 requirements can be audited, there is no certification for conformance. Unlike for ISO/IEC 20000, organizations cannot have their service management system 'FitSM certified'.

A qualification and certification scheme for personnel, much like those established for ITIL and ISO/IEC 20000, but involving fewer and shorter trainings, was started in 2013.

== Origin ==
FitSM is based on deliverables of FedSM, a project funded in the 7th Framework Program for Research and Technological Development by the European Union. The original aim of FedSM was to "increase maturity and effectiveness of Service Management in federated e-Infrastructures by applying suitable good practices."

How to establish management processes across federated organizational structures is not considered in traditional ITSM frameworks, and can pose a difficult task when trying to introduce ITSM in E-infrastructures which often distribute the provisioning of services among a federation of peer organizations. However, a much larger challenge to introducing ITSM at FedSM's client organizations turned out be the adaptation of the very comprehensive ITSM guidance described by traditional ITSM frameworks to a set of practices that could realistically be implemented in relatively small organizations within the project lifetime of three years. From May 2013, to foster the beginning interest in FedSM's "lightweight" ITSM guidance by IT organizations from outside the e-Infrastructure community, the project consortium started publishing revised versions project deliverables under the FitSM name.

The team members have announced on their project website that the FitSM standard will continue to be maintained in the future within the framework of a working group of IT Education Management Organisation ITEMO.
