= BISL =

BISL may refer to:

- The British Ice Hockey Superleague, a professional ice hockey league in the United Kingdom between 1996 and 2003
- Business Information Services Library (capitalized BiSL), a framework used for functional and information management
- Business in Sport and Leisure, a British umbrella organization of a number of major sport and leisure companies
- British International School of Ljubljana, a school located in Ljubljana, Slovenia
- Bay Islands Sign Language, a village sign of Honduras notable for its tactile form.
