= SupportDesk =

Software tool

SupportDesk is a service desk software tool for IT support staff and help desk engineers, allowing them to log and categorise calls, assign tasks, monitor progress and track purchase orders. It has an open design which can be extended.
