= Henry Tudor =

Henry Tudor may refer to:

- Henry VII of England (1457–1509), born Henry Tudor
- Henry VIII of England (1491–1547), son of Henry VII
- Henry, Duke of Cornwall (1511), son of Henry VIII
- Henry FitzRoy, 1st Duke of Richmond and Somerset (1519–1536), son of Henry VIII and mistress Elizabeth Blount
- Henri Tudor (1859–1928), Luxembourgish engineer
- Henry Hugh Tudor (1871–1965), British Army Major General
