= CRP Henri Tudor =

Luxembourgish research institute

Coordinates: 49°29′58.24″N 5°59′11.62″E

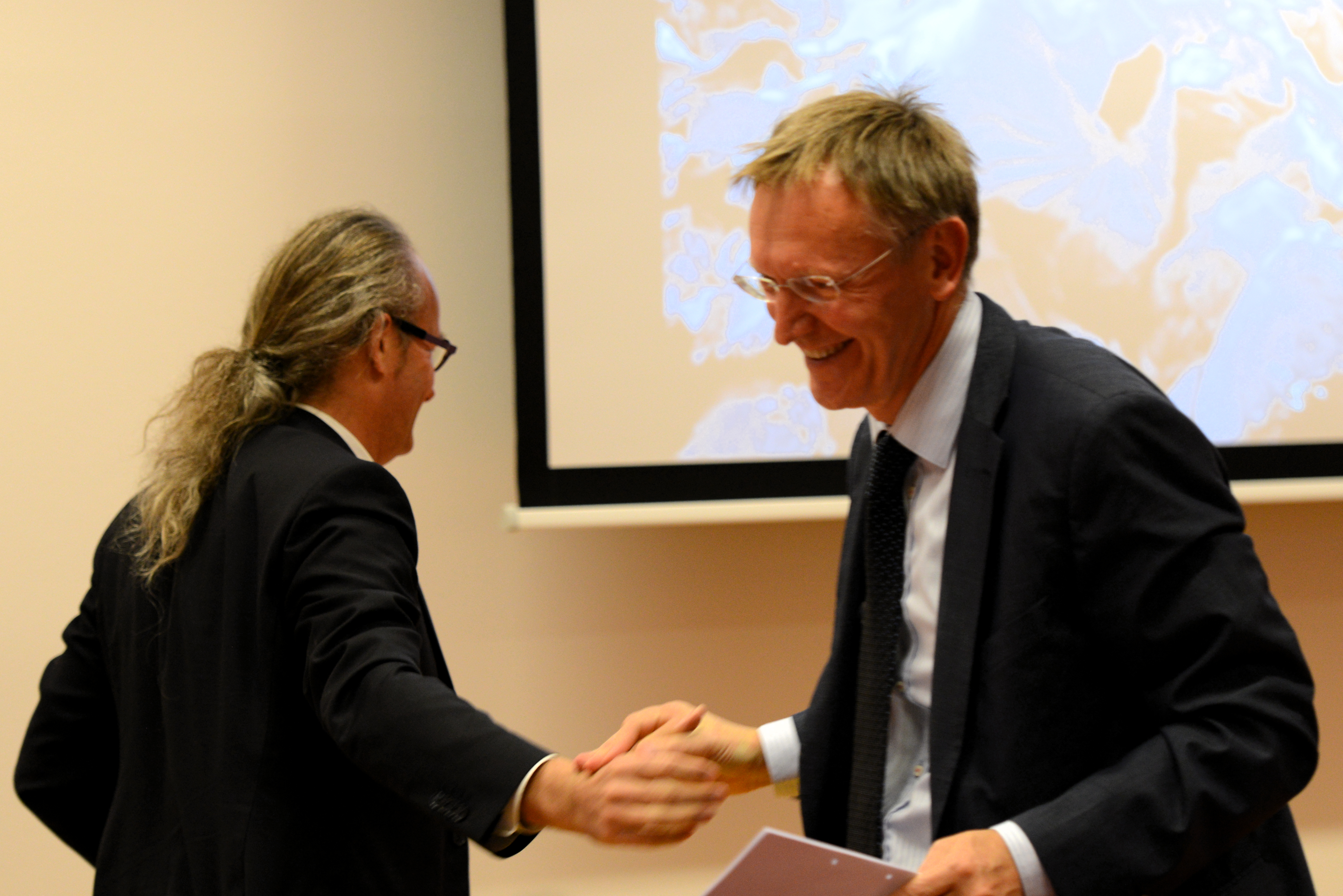
Claude Turmes and Janez Potočnik, during the conference-debate: «Économie circulaire et nouvelles formes de consommation. Stratégies européennes et perspectives luxembourgeoises» Oktober 20, 2014 at the CRP Henri-Tudor in Kirchberg, Luxembourg.

The Public Research Centre Henri Tudor (or CRP Henri Tudor) is a Luxembourg-based research institute. Created in late 1987, in the framework of the Luxembourgish law of 9 March 1987 about public research, the CRP Henri Tudor took its name from Henri Owen Tudor, a famous Luxembourgish engineer.

CRP Henri Tudor's main mission was to contribute to the improvement and the strengthening of the innovation capacities of enterprises and public organizations. On 1 January 2015, the Public Research Centre Henri Tudor and the Public Research Center Gabriel Lippmann merged to form a new Research and Technology Organization (RTO), the Luxembourg Institute of Science and Technology.

== Activities and services ==
Applied, experimental and doctoral research; development of tools, methods, labels, certifications and standards; technological assistance, consulting and watch services; knowledge and competence transfer; incubation of high-tech companies as well as training and high-level qualification were part of CRP Henri Tudor's scope of activities.

== Competence domains ==
With the signature of the Performance Contract 2008–2010 with the Luxembourgish State, CRP Henri Tudor's activities were oriented towards five scientific and technological fields:

- Information and Communication Technologies (ICT)
- Environmental Technologies
- Health Care Technologies
- Materials Technologies
- Business Organisation and Management

== Departments ==
Departments of the Public Research Centre Henri Tudor were:

- Resource Centre for Environmental Technologies (CRTE)
- Resource Centre for Health Care Technologies (CR SANTEC)
- Resource Centre for Technologies and Innovation in Construction (CRTI-B)
- SITec®, Knowledge Transfer & Training Centre
- Technology Watch Centre (CVT)
- High-tech business incubator Technoport®
- Advanced Materials & Structures (AMS)
- Service Science & Innovation (SSI)

== See also ==
- Tudor IT Process Assessment, a method for assessment of IT processes
