= Application Services Library =

The Application Services Library (ASL) is a public domain framework of best practices used to standardize processes within Application Management, the discipline of producing and maintaining information systems and applications. The term "library" is used because ASL is presented as a set of books describing best practices from the IT industry.

ASL is closely related to the frameworks ITIL (for IT Service Management) and BiSL (for Information Management and Functional Management) and to the Capability Maturity Model (CMM).

The ASL framework was developed because ITIL proved inadequate for Application Management. At that time, ITIL lacked specific guidance for application design, development, maintenance, and support. Newer ITIL versions, particularly V3, have increasingly addressed the Application Development and Application Management domains; the ASL BiSL Foundation has published a white paper comparing ITIL v3 and ASL.

ASL was developed in the late nineties in the Netherlands, originally as the proprietary R2C model, which evolved into ASL in 2000. In 2001 it was donated by the IT Service Provider PinkRoccade to the ASL Foundation, now the ASL BiSL Foundation. The version ASL2 was published in 2009.

== Purpose ==
The ASL2 is intended to support Application Management by providing tools. Two main categories of aids are defined:

- Descriptions of the processes for Application Management and the use of best-practises
- Standardized terminology to avoid confusion

== Structure of ASL2 ==
ASL2 contains 3 levels, 6 clusters of processes (3 on the operational level, 1 on the tactical level, 2 on the strategic level) and a total of 26 processes.

=== Operational level ===
==== Application Support cluster ====
There are 4 processes within the Application Support cluster. The processes in the Service Organisation cluster support the daily use of the information systems. The processes in this cluster are:

- Use Support
- Configuration Management
- IT Operation Management
- Continuity Management

These processes have as well been defined in the ITIL framework. The processes are similar but are viewed from another point of view, therefore the activities in each of these processes may differ from the activities in an ITIL-environment.

==== Application Maintenance and Renewal cluster ====
There are 5 processes within the Application Maintenance and Renewal cluster. Within this cluster, the majority of the work of Application Development is done. A major part of the work of Application Management deals with designing, programming and testing applications and information systems. Processes are:

- Impact analysis
- Design
- Realization
- Testing
- Implementation

These processes are not described at all in the ITIL V1 framework, but do have their counterparts in BiSL, the model for Information management / Functional Management.

==== Connecting Processes Operational Level cluster ====
There are 2 processes within the Connecting Processes Operational Level cluster. The connecting processes aim at the synchronisation of the activities between Service Organisation/operations (using the applications) and development and maintenance (changing the applications). The two processes included are:

- Change Management
- Software Control and Distribution

=== Management level ===
==== Management Processes cluster ====
There are 5 processes within the Management Processes cluster. The processes in this cluster are used in the management of the activities within the clusters on the operational level. The processes are located on the tactical level, are used for steering the operational processes. The processes included are:

- Contract Management
- Planning and Control
- Quality Management
- Financial Management
- Supplier Management

=== Strategic level ===
==== Application Strategy cluster ====
There are 5 processes within the Application Strategy cluster. Applications live for longer than expected. Systems, functionality, concepts, and structure of information systems remain stable over many years. This knowledge is rarely used. It is important that, while maintaining and enhancing systems, there is a clear view needed what the demands are in the future, and based on that, what and how the future of these applications should look like. This view, the application management strategies, is created within the cluster Application Strategy. The processes in this cluster are:

- IT Developments Strategy
- Customer Organizations Strategy
- Customer Environment Strategy
- Application Life Cycle Management
- Application Portfolio Management

==== Application Management Organization Strategy cluster ====
There are 5 processes within the Application Management Organization Strategy cluster. Also, the future of the Application Management organisation, with aspects such as skills and capabilities, markets, and customers, is very important. Creating the organisation management strategies for this is the aim of Application Management Organization Strategy cluster. Processes in this cluster include:

- Account and Market Definition
- Capabilities Definition
- Technology Definition
- Supplier Definition
- Service Delivery Definition

== ASL2 Maturity Model ==
There is also ASL2 Maturity Model with 5 levels of process maturity:

- Level 1 - Initial
- Level 2 - Repeatable
- Level 3 - Defined and managed
- Level 4 - Optimizing
- Level 5 - Chain
