= EIA-649 National Consensus Standard for Configuration Management =

Industry standard

ANSI/EIA-649, "National Consensus Standard for Configuration Management", is an industry standard for configuration management.

== Overview ==
ANSI/EIA-649 was developed in 1994, when the Electronic Industries Alliance’s (EIA) G-33 Committee on Data and Configuration Management (CM) initiated a task to develop an industry Configuration Management (CM) standard. Their goal was to address overall requirements, principles, and best practices in configuration management without mandating the use of specific terminology or approaches on how Configuration Management (CM) should be implemented in any particular environment.

Instead, this document provides a standardized definition and explanation for Configuration Management (CM) while also providing the rationale for the various CM processes. This, along with its neutral terminology, allows the standard to be applied in a variety of environments - governmental, industrial, and commercial.

In addition to standardizing the understanding of Configuration Management (CM), EIA-649 provides a rational basis upon which to apply good judgment in both planning for and executing CM across the enterprise. The knowledge contained in EIA-649 is intended to assist in establishing, performing, and/or evaluating CM systems.

ANSI/EIA-649, along with all updated versions to this standard, defines and explains the five primary functions or elements of configuration management: CM Planning, Configuration Identification, change management, status accounting, and verification & audit.

ANSI/EIA-649B is currently owned by SAE International, a U.S.-based, globally active professional association and standards organization for engineering professionals in various industries. It was formerly owned by TechAmerica, previously Government Electronics and Information Technology Association (GEIA).

== EIA-649's International Standardization ==
EIA-649 is considered to have International Standardization implication, as determined by EIA (Electronic Industries Alliance) and TechAmerica, both of which are US-based trade associations.

EIA-649 is an internationally recognized consensus standard. EIA standards and TechAmerica standards, such as ANSI/EIA-649B, are designed to serve public interest by eliminating misunderstandings between manufacturers & purchasers, facilitating interchangeability & improvement of products, and assisting purchasers in selecting & obtaining proper products.

== Reasons to use ANSI/EIA-649 ==
This standard states that when configuration management principles are applied using effective practices, return on investment is maximized and product life cycle costs are reduced. When CM is effectively and consistently applied, it provides a positive impact on product quality, cost, and schedule by ensuring consistency of a product's performance, functional and physical attributes with its requirements, design, and operational information. The essence of configuration management has universal applicability across the broad spectrum of commercial and government enterprises. This standard provides an understanding of what to do, why a customer/supplier should do it, and when it is necessary to tailor the application of CM functions. This standard fulfills the important function of providing a rational basis upon which to apply good judgment in both planning for and executing CM across the enterprise.

== Role in the US DoD ==
EIA-649 was adopted for use by the United States Department of Defense (DoD) in February 1999, replacing Mil-Std-973. Even though the US DoD has 649 called out as a guidance document in their contracts, EIA-649 is currently used in both commercial and governmental environments since the authors of EIA-649 tried not to express preference for any particular set of terms or terminology

== Name changes ==
As of February 7, 2019, the current version of ANSI/EIA-649 is 649C, "Configuration Management Standard".

- SAE ANSI/EIA-649C
- SAE ANSI/EIA-649C "Configuration Management Standard"
- ANSI/EIA-649-C-2019
- SAE ANSI/EIA-649B
- SAE ANSI/EIA-649B "Configuration Management Standard"
- ANSI/EIA 649-B-2011
- TechAmerica EIA-649-B (June 2011)
- TechAmerica EIA-649-A (April 2004)
- TechAmerica EIA-649 (August 1998)
- ANSI/EIA-649-1998 "National Consensus Standard for Configuration Management"
- ANSI/EIA-649
- EIA-649
- EIA649

== About EIA-649-1, -2 and future "Dash" series ==
SAE EIA-649-1, “Configuration Management Requirements For Defense Contracts”, was released in November 2014. This is a defense-specific, stand alone "supplement" to EIA-649B that provides requirements specific for Defense contracts, such as placing tailored configuration management requirements on Defense contracts. 649-1 is not a replacement for SAE ANSI/EIA-649B.

SAE EIA-649-2, “Configuration Management Requirements for NASA Enterprises”, was released in April 2015. This companion standard is needed to provide a resource that standardizes Configuration Management (CM) requirements specific to National Aeronautics and Space Administration (NASA) agreements and design activities. This Standard provides a template of CM requirements and user guidance for tailoring the requirements for each unique use case. This standard has been revised to incorporate content changes proposed by the G33 Committee that were not included in the original release.

There have been rumors that other organizations, such as the FAA, will come out with their own "dash" series to supplement 649B as well.

== Resources ==
- SAE EIA-649C - Configuration Management Standard
