= Tudor batteries =

Brand of batteries

Tudor Batteries
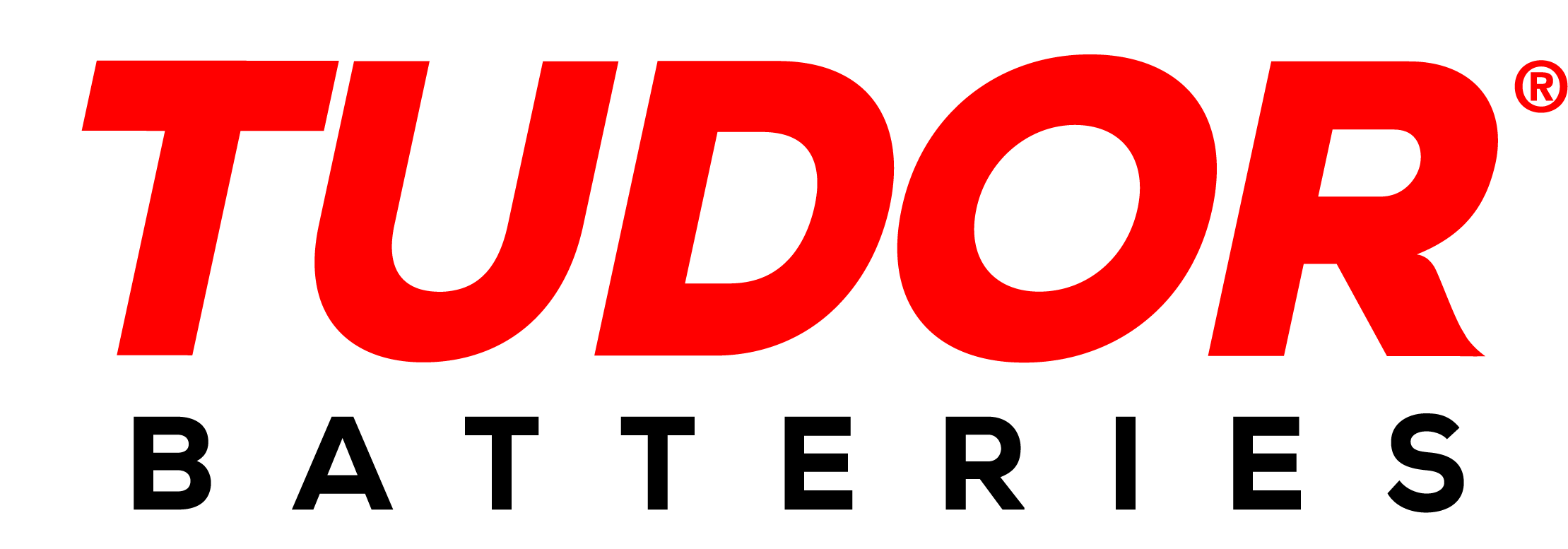
- Industry: Lead-acid battery
- Founded: 1890
- Founder: Henri Tudor
- Website: http://tudorbatt.info/

Tudor is a lead-acid battery brand founded by Henri Tudor in 1890 and is now owned by Exide Technologies.

== History ==
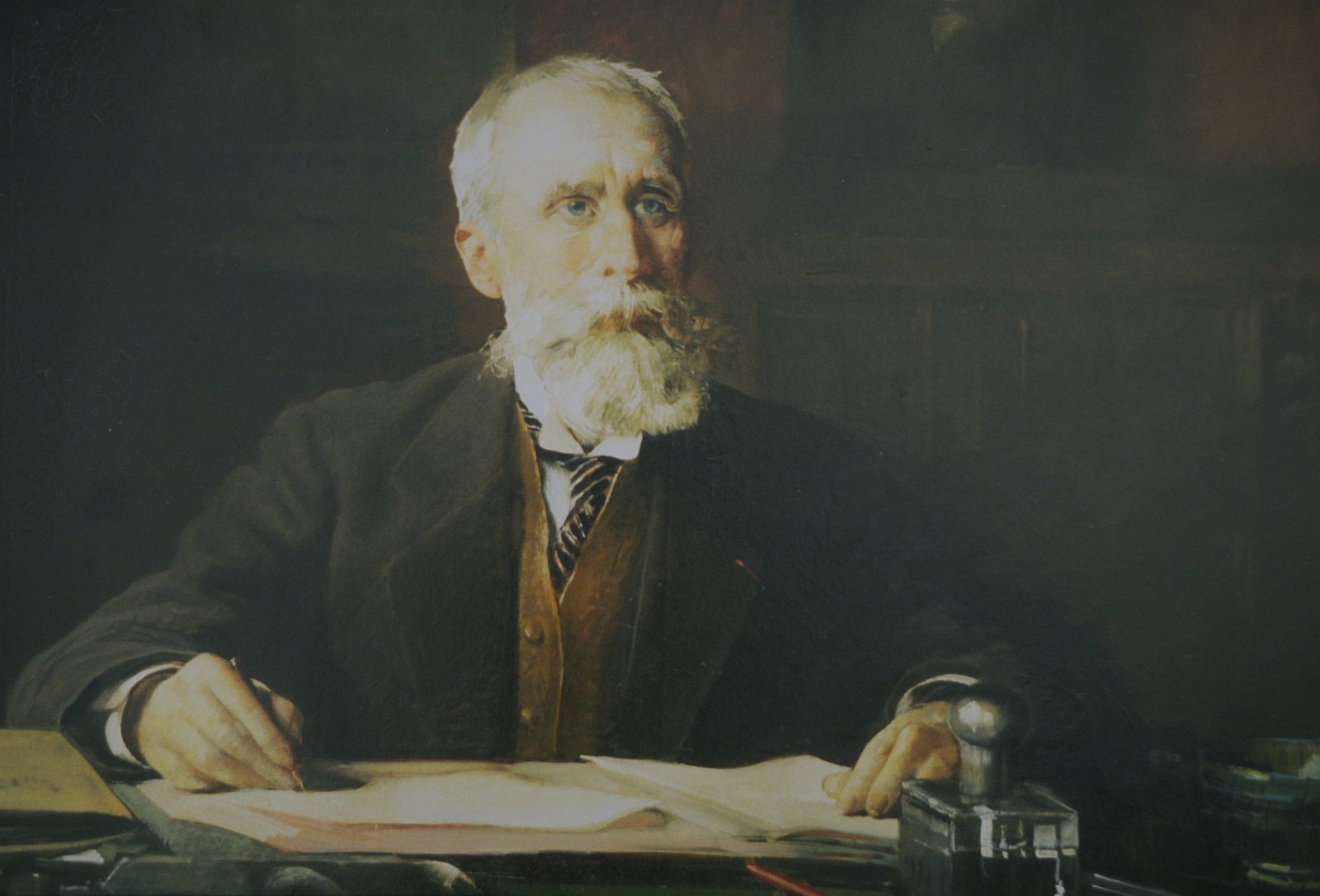
Henri Tudor

=== The start ===
Henri Tudor from Rosport created in 1890 what will become later the Tudor batteries brand: the Société anonyme Franco-Belge pour la fabrication de l'accumulateur Tudor (Franco-Belgian anonymous society for the manufacture of the Tudor Accumulator). At that time, more than 1200 Tudor batteries were in service in Belgium and abroad including Germany, France, Austria, Spain, Egypt, Denmark, Finland, Sweden, Switzerland, Hungary, the Netherlands, Italy, Poland and Argentina. The emblem was the name of the brand with the head of a griffin, which originated in the family of Henri Tudor's uncle, Robert Leadbitter from Newcastle-on-Tyne in Northumberland. Tudor had licensed his brand in many countries like Germany (Accumulatoren-Fabrik Aktiengesellschaft (AFA)) and Spain (la Sociedad Española Del Acumulador).

In 1901, Henri Tudor decided to change the name of the firm to Société anonyme des accumulateurs Tudor (Joint-stock company of the Tudor Accumulators) with operating sites in Lille and Florival. Later in 1908, the Rosport site was closed. As Tudor Spain became more profitable, the shareholding shifted and AFA became the majority shareholder in 1903. Tudor imported equipment from Germany.

=== During World War I ===
When the first world war broke out in 1914, AFA removed from Tudor Spain's capital. Three directors resigned and the situation was critical. However, in 1916, Tudor Spain became the supplier of two starting batteries models manufactured in Spain. In others European countries during WWI, plants were completely plundered, like in Belgium and in Luxembourg. These events will not hinder the company to have, between the two world wars nearly 25,000 employees at the Florival plant. In 1920, Tudor Spain supplied the first battery for a submarine (Isaac Peral), with funding from The Akkumulator Fabrik AG.

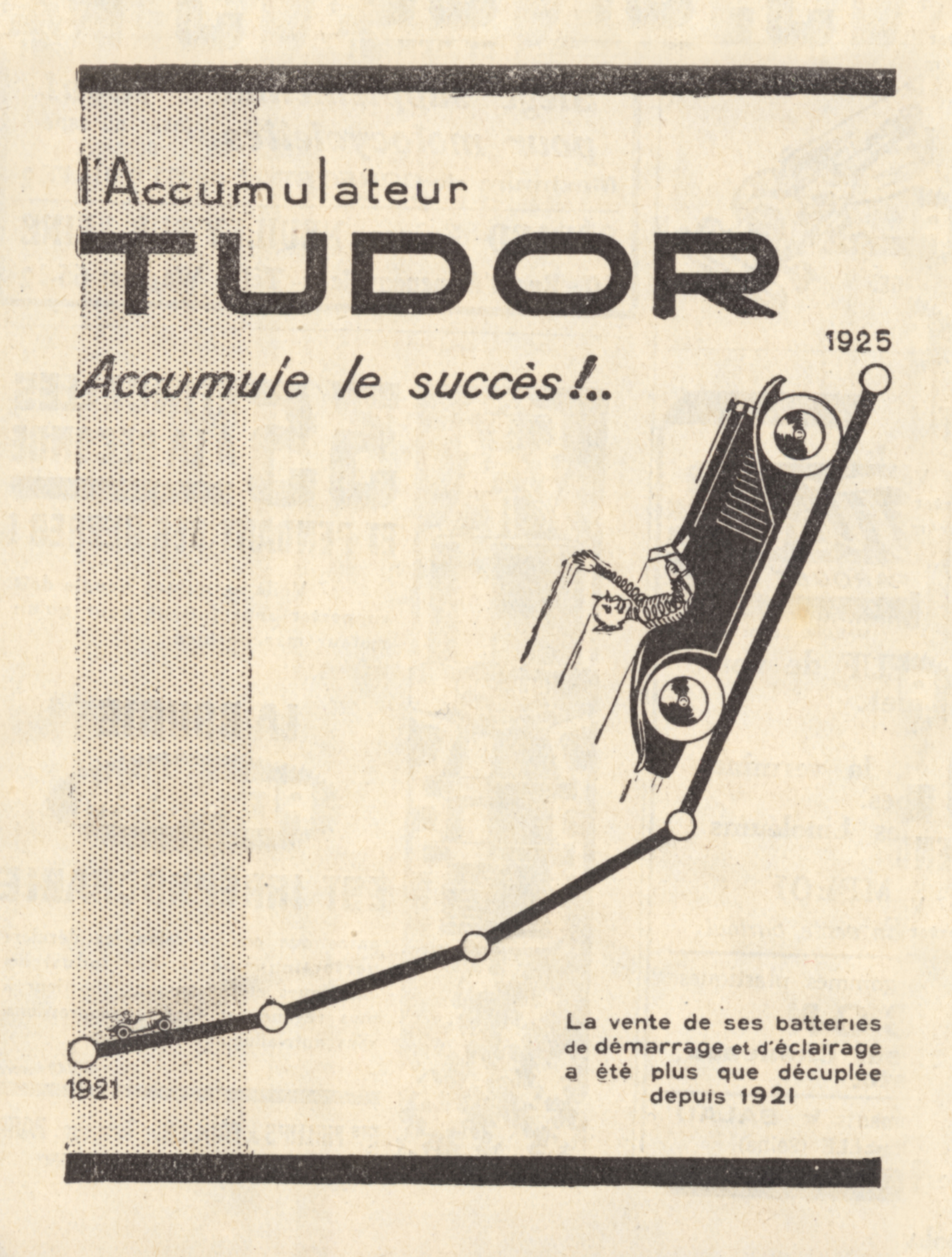
Tudor Accumulator - Accumulates Success

=== The succession ===
In 1928, after Henri Tudor's death, his son John took the succession as Managing director of “Accumulateurs Tudor”

During the following years, the traction battery market will strongly rise. However, the first expansion of their plants were based on stationary batteries. For these facilities, the company proposed service contracts under which it bound up with keeping the battery in good working order for a period of ten years against a fixed remuneration. From 1931, "Accumulateurs Tudor" introduced widely the traction battery which is especially used for the industry handling equipment.

In 1939, Tudor batteries France made the acquisition of the Belgian Society of Fulmen accumulator S.A. with its 5900 m² site located in Leeuw-St.Pierre.

=== After World War II ===
- From 1945, la Société anonyme Accumulateurs Tudor became one of the main starter batteries suppliers for the automotive industry.
- In 1948 the capital of the company was increased to 30 million Francs.
- During the fifties, the traction battery market expanded considerably following the needs for reconstruction and development of handling equipment.
- In 1957, Auguste Charles Laval became CEO of Tudor France and started a corporate restructuring with the centralization of the manufacturing on the Florival site.
- In 1965, Tudor enhances its quality image by becoming the exclusive large automotive OEM brands including Ford, Peugeot and Renault.
- About 1967, the Florival plant had around 600 workers. It produced 4.000 accumulators a day. A car on two in Belgium runs with a Tudor accumulator.

=== Two successive recessions ===
The 1974 recession was keenly felt. The first half of 1981 was characterized by a new crisis resulting in technical unemployment and a deficit. In 1982, the plant underwent thirteen days strike while production was one million pieces per year. The company suffered from the global overcapacity in the starter battery, which represented 65% of revenues.

The goal was to reduce this proportion to 50%. Sales were divided between Germany, Benelux and France, with a predominance of the French market. The competition was Japanese, but also Europe with the establishment of a major General Motors production plant in Sarreguemines. The lifetime of the batteries significantly lengthened, and replacements became less frequent.

=== Additional investment ===
A continuous casting installation of grids, representing an investment of one million dollars, was commissioned in 1982. At the trays, antique ebony gave way to lighter and more resistant polymers. The stationary battery was the subject of high demand in the area of preventing interruptions (telephone exchanges, operating rooms, computer rooms). Batteries handling equipment however accounted for 70% of turnover of industrial battery.

=== Integration in a global economy ===
Eventually, the Florival site (in the city of Grez-Doiceau) suffered from its initial geographical limits. In 1990, the “Société Anonyme Tudor accumulators" was absorbed by the C.E.A.C.(European Accumulators Company) based in Gennevilliers (France) which was a French-Italian company. C.E.A.C., well-known for its Fulmen brand, thus became also owner of the Tudor brand in some country. The production activities of the Florival site were reduced gradually.

In October 1994, Exide Technologies took over the “Sociedad Española del Acumulador Tudor”. The Spanish company was, with Tudor India and Tudor Swedish, one of the last social reasons to keep using Tudor brand. In 1995 Exide Technologies also took C.E.A.C. The Florival site became a distribution center.
