= Tudor IT Process Assessment =

Process assessment framework

Tudor IT Process Assessment (TIPA) is a methodological framework for process assessment. Its first version was published in 2003 by the Public Research Centre Henri Tudor based in Luxembourg. TIPA is now a registered trademark of the Luxembourg Institute of Science and Technology (LIST). TIPA offers a structured approach to determine process capability compared to recognized best practices. TIPA also supports process improvement by providing a gap analysis and proposing improvement recommendations.

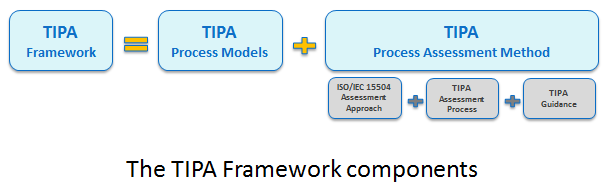
TIPA combines domain-specific process models with the generic TIPA Process Assessment Method.

TIPA uses the generic approach for process assessment published by the International Organization for Standardization (ISO) and the International Electrotechnical Commission (IEC) in ISO/IEC 15504 – Process Assessment (now ISO/IEC 33000). The ISO/IEC 15504-2 requirements on performing assessments are structured and documented in the TIPA Assessment Process. Additional guidance, contextual advice and return of experience complete the TIPA Process Assessment Method and support the usability of the TIPA framework. The TIPA Process Assessment Method (TIPA) can be used to assess processes from any field of activity.

The TIPA framework is supported by an exhaustive toolbox that provides templates and tools for every single step of the assessment process. It can be customized to any application domain.

== Overview ==
A process assessment is conducted to get a clear view of the current practices in an organization in a particular domain (e.g. the IT service management domain in TIPA for ITIL). The goal is to compare these practices to a renowned reference so that the current status of the processes can be measured and appropriate suggestions for process improvement can be made.

The gap analysis helps identify SWOTs, get a clear picture of the current state and identify improvement recommendations.

Interviews with process actors are used to understand how process is performed and a process maturity rating scale is used to measure the gap between the frame of reference and the field reality. An assessment project starts with a clear goal statement to define the scope of the project. The project involves a series of roles who take part in the assessment. The project is organized in 6 phases. It is supported by several tools (templates and spreadsheets) provided in the TIPA Toolbox.

== History ==
In 2002, the first cases of adoption of ITIL were observed on the Luxembourg market. At the same period, the ISO/IEC TR 15504 Process Assessment standard series was upgraded towards the creation of a generic standard for process assessment, enabling the assessment processes in any kind of domain. Researchers from CRP Henri Tudor, being active members of the ISO working group in charge of that transformation within ISO/IEC JTC 1/SC 7, got the idea to apply and experiment this new generic assessment framework to both software and IT operation processes.

This led to the definition of the AIDA (Assessment and Improvement integrateD Approach) research & development project in 2003, aiming at applying a common method for the definition and assessment of processes for both the software development and IT operations sides. The project resulted in the creation of a structured process assessment method for IT Service Management based on ITIL. That method was fully compatible with the method described in ISO/IEC 15504 originally designed to assess software development processes.

The first Process Assessment model for ITIL v2 was developed and experimented during the years 2004–2005 in partnership with ITIL experts. More experimentation took place in the following years locally in Luxembourg and several other regions of the world. In 2009 AIDA was rebranded as TIPA (Tudor IT Process Assessment) and this brand officially registered. The complete method was published in the book “ITSM Process Assessment Supporting ITIL“, released in 2009. A major upgrade of TIPA for ITIL took place in 2013 to align the framework with ITIL 2011. That upgrade has also been the opportunity to improve the overall quality of the framework based on the 8 years of experience by Tudor and historical users of the method. The last upgrade was done in March 2014 to introduce classes of assessment aligned with the requirements of the ISO/IEC 3300x series, evolution of the ISO/IEC 15504.

On 1 January 2015, the Public Research Centre Henri Tudor and the Public Research Center Gabriel Lippmann merged to form a new RTO (Research and Technology Organisation), the Luxembourg Institute of Science & Technology (LIST). The current original TIPA team continues to maintain and develop content around TIPA as part of the LIST.

== Applications ==
- Comparing processes with the state of the art
- Determining process capability
- Comparing process capability with processes from other domains
- Identifying process strengths, weaknesses, and areas of improvement
- Structuring the improvement initiative and setup priorities
- Monitoring the progress and demonstrate the merits of improvement actions
- Benchmarking partners
- Benchmarking with competitors
- Supporting provider selection according to business goals and customer requirements

== TIPA for ITIL ==
TIPA for ITIL is the application of the TIPA framework to the IT Service Management domain. It applies the TIPA assessment method to the IT Service Management best practices described in ITIL 2011

=== ISO/IEC 15504 ===
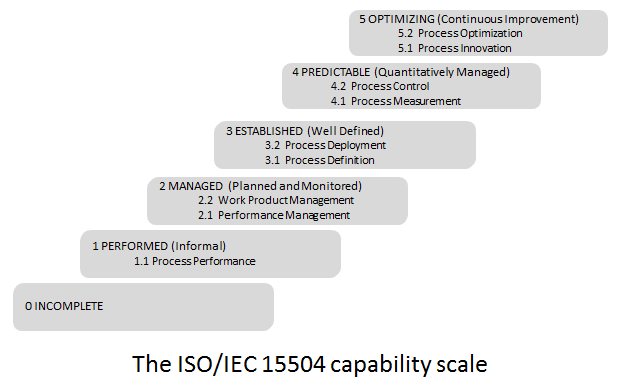
Processes are defined by 9 attributes. The definition of the attributes helps understanding the process capability.

TIPA is applying the assessment approach defined in ISO/IEC 15504, which can be used:

a) By or on behalf of an organization with the objective of understanding the state of its own processes for process improvement;
b) By or on behalf of an organization with the objective of determining the suitability of its own processes for a particular requirement or class of requirements;
c) By or on behalf of one organization with the objective of determining the suitability of another organization’s processes for a particular contract or class of contracts.

TIPA has structured its assessment method targeting mostly the first application area of ISO/IEC 15504 (process improvement) but supports the two other ones also.

TIPA is using the rating scale and capability levels defined in the ISO/IEC 15504 measurement framework. The four point ordinal rating scale (Not achieved, Partially achieved, Largely achieved and Fully achieved) is used to express the levels of achievement of the process attributes.

=== ITIL ===
ITIL is a set of best practices for IT service management (ITSM) that focus on aligning IT services with the needs of business. ITIL has structured these best practices as processes. TIPA for ITIL enables to assess these processes. But ISO/IEC 15504 process assessment is to be performed against a compliant process assessment model, which combines the description of the process in terms of process purpose and outcomes, with performance and capability indicators. The TIPA process assessment model for ITIL contains that structured description of the ITIL processes. It was developed applying requirements engineering techniques that support the quality characteristics expected from a compliant process model (traceability, comprehensiveness, usability, assessability).

=== TIPA specifics ===
TIPA:

- Extends the set of requirements from ISO/IEC 15504 with the provision of a detailed documented assessment process.
- Focuses on interviews as main means for collecting evidence of process implementation and process capability.
- Highlights the need to perform a sound SWOT analysis as part of the assessment process for process improvement.
- Is provided with an exhaustive toolbox that provides templates and tools for every single step of the assessment process. It can be customized to any application domain.

== TIPA Components ==
=== 6 phases ===
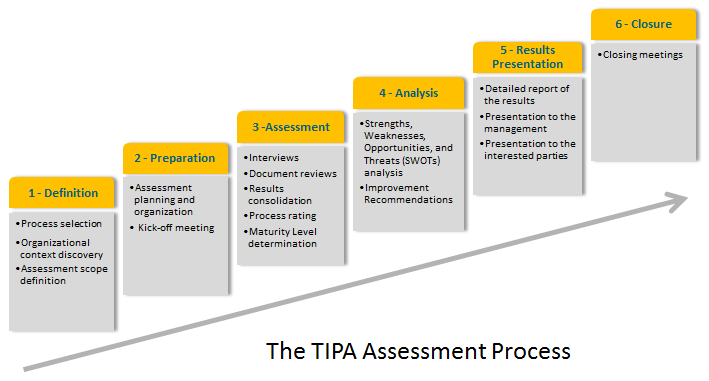
An assessment is structured as a project, each phase being a prerequisite for the next one. Some activities may be optional for Class 3 assessments.

==== Definition phase ====
During the definition phase, the main objectives are to define the scope of the assessment, to identify the key actors, to agree on a service offer and to agree on the assessment scope agreement.

==== Preparation phase ====
In this phase, the objective is to discover the organizational context, and then to do an assessment planning and define the organization (by preparing the Assessment team, the supporting documents used during the assessment and the people who will be interviewed).

==== Assessment phase ====
The phase is the key of the process assessment, during which interviews are done and documents reviewed to enable process rating and process capability level determination.

==== Analysis phase ====
After the Assessment phase the collected information are analysed and a SWOT analysis is performed before making improvement recommendations

==== Result presentation phase ====
The results are presented to the relevant stakeholders, and the detailed assessment report is rendered.

==== Assessment closure phase ====
The assessment project can then be closed.

=== Roles ===
The six phases are supervised by at one Lead Assessor and are implemented by one or several Assessor(s).

TIPA Assessor: he conducts the interviews and analyses the results to draw conclusions on the assessed process maturity.

TIPA Lead Assessor: he is accountable for the compliance of the method delivered and for the assessment results. He is the project manager of the assessment project. A TIPA assessment cannot be done without a Lead Assessor.

=== The TIPA classes of assessment ===
Like in the Standard CMMI Appraisal Method for Process Improvement (SCAMPI), there are three different classes of assessment in TIPA. A TIPA assessment can be performed using Class 1, 2 or 3 depending on the level of confidence required on the assessment results, and on the amount of resources available to perform that assessment. TIPA Class 1 requires more resources than TIPA Class 2 and TIPA Class 2 requires more resource than TIPA Class 3.

TIPA Class 1 is the most reliable class; it allows a high level of objectivity, rigor and confidence in the assessment result, thanks to a large collection of evidence, over and above the other two classes.

TIPA Class 2 corresponds to the original TIPA assessment method; it is a good balance between required resources and the usability of the assessment results.

TIPA Class 3 is the less exhaustive assessment method. It requires less resources, rating evidence and time than the two other classes, but also provides limited assessment results with minimal process analysis.

==== Comparative table of assessment classes ====
	TIPA Class 1	TIPA Class 2	TIPA Class 3
Management of the assessment project	1 certified TIPA Lead Assessor required		
Number of Assessors (per process)	2 certified TIPA Assessors (one can be the project's Lead Assessor)	2 certified TIPA Assessors (one can be the project's Lead Assessor)	1 certified TIPA Assessor (who can be the project's Lead Assessor)
Independence of the Assessment Team	Assessment Team fully independent from the organization being assessed	Assessment Team with separation of responsibility from the personnel in the organization being assessed	No requirement on the independence of the Assessment Team
Minimum number of interviews (per process)	4	3	2
Rating of interviews	1 rating per interview	1 rating per interview	1 single rating allowed for all interviews
Level of rigor	+++	+++	++
Level of confidence	+++	++	++
Repeatability	+++	+++	+
Costs	+++	++	+
Publication of results	Certificate	Certificate	Certificate

=== Tools ===
The TIPA toolbox gathers methodological and office tools to support all phases of a TIPA assessment. All TIPA Certified Assessors can use this toolbox to perform their TIPA assessment. The TIPA toolbox contains:

- The TIPA presentation templates
- The TIPA Process Assessment Model
- The project management toolset
- Questionnaires
- The process rating toolset
- Assessment report templates

== TIPA Certifications ==
The transfer of TIPA for ITIL on the market is supported by a training and certification program run in partnership between ITpreneurs (training provider) and the Luxembourg Institute of Science and Technology (certification authority). Certifications available are: TIPA Assessor for ITIL and TIPA Lead Assessor.

== Links to others frameworks ==
=== CMMI ===
CMMI-SVC can be considered as the nearest competitor of TIPA, but differences remain. Indeed, CMMI-SVC targets assessment of services in general whereas TIPA for ITIL concentrates its efforts on IT services. CMMI supports both process capability and organisational maturity.

=== ISO/IEC 20000 ===
ISO/IEC 20000 is the international standard that allows companies to demonstrate their excellence in IT management through the certification of their IT service management system. TIPA for ITIL can help organizations get prepared for ISO/IEC 20000 certification as TIPA for ITIL covers a large part of the process used in ISO/IEC 20000, but provides more support for the assessment and improvement of these processes.

=== ISO/IEC 33000 ===
ISO/IEC 33000 is an evolution of ISO/IEC 15504 published at the end of February 2015. The recent works on TIPA, including the introduction of the classes of assessment are aligned with the works conducted at ISO on the ISO/IEC 33000 series.

== Partnership ==
TIPA was developed by Public Research Centre Henri Tudor thanks to the support of several partners amongst which:

- Van Haren Publishing, publisher on best practices, methods and standard. They are the publisher of the TIPA handbook “ITSM Process Assessment supporting ITIL”.
- ITPreneurs, provider of IT training content and services. They are the official training provider for TIPA for ITIL.

== Limitations ==
TIPA has renamed process capability as process maturity, which may cause confusion.

TIPA for ITIL does not allow making an assessment of organisational maturity. Moreover, no benchmarking data is available so far.

== Bibliography ==
- Itsm Process Assessment Supporting Itil - Using Tipa to Assess and Improve Your Processes With Iso 15504 and Prepare for Iso 20000 Certification (First ed.). Van Haren Publishing. December 2009. ISBN 9789087535643. Archived from the original (PDF or hardcopy) on 22 August 2014.
