= IT process automation =

IT process automation (ITPA) is a series of processes which facilitate the orchestration and integration of tools, people and processes through automated workflows. ITPA software applications can be programmed to perform any repeatable pattern, task or business workflow that was once handled manually by humans.

== Description ==
ITPA is often used interchangeably with the term run book automation (RBA).

IT departments in organizations of every size and industry can employ ITPA technology to specify certain criteria and outcomes for almost any task or process currently being performed. When a system event occurs, the appropriate workflow is triggered and executed to automatically address and remediate the problem. This is often seen in IT service management or ESM during the ticketing process, it is becoming much more commonplace in daily business functions.

Advanced ITPA software is intuitive enough to automate complex processes across multiple systems with or without the need for human input. When desired or necessary, human decision points can also be embedded into the workflow ensuring that the appropriate IT personnel receive alerts and/or escalations and can quickly respond accordingly.

Some ITPA software products can be fully and seamlessly integrated with various existing systems, applications and platforms. This may include monitoring, incident response, messaging and notification and much more.

== Applications ==
The purpose of IT process automation is to streamline IT operations in a number of areas and facets. It is used to replace repetitive manual tasks, processes and workflows with automated solutions. The ITPA product can be versatile enough to bridge multiple systems, applications and platforms to create a more uniform IT infrastructure.

Each task is designed as a workflow which contains specified procedures, conditions and triggers. Automated workflows can be scheduled in advance, or designed to be triggered based on specific events or conditions. For instance, an automated workflow to perform routine system maintenance tasks could be scheduled to execute automatically at a designated time each day or week.

Another automated process might be triggered, based on a particular event, such as a stoppage of service or system outage. Based on predetermined control flows, the ITPA tool can automatically remediate the problem or send alerts/escalations to the appropriate human decision-maker for immediate action.

== Results ==
Businesses employing IT process automation may experience a number of consequences including:

- Cost savings
- Increased productivity
- Greater efficiency
- Reduction in errors
- Faster response to system problems
- Improved service levels
- Job losses

== Related Concepts ==
- robotic process automation (RPA)
- workload automation
- ITSM automation
- NOC automation
- SOC automation
- SIEM automation
- Self-service automation
- payroll automation
