= IT Service Management Forum =

The IT Service Management Forum (itSMF) is an independent, international, not-for-profit organization of IT service management (ITSM) professionals worldwide. Around the operation of IT services the itSMF collects, develops and publishes best practices, supports education and training, discusses the development of ITSM tools, initiates advisory ideas about ITSM and holds conventions. The itSMF is concerned with promoting best practices in IT service management and has a strong interest in the international ISO/IEC 20000 standard. The itSMF publishes books covering various aspects of service management through a process of endorsing them as part of the itSMF Library.

== History ==
With a growing number of national chapters a real international umbrella was needed. The itSMF International was created in 2004.

== International organization and activities ==
Typical activities in the national chapters were: itSMF chapters were partner of conferences of other organizations (e.g. Gartner “Business Intelligence & Information Management Summit 2013” in Australia). There were own studies or together with other, well known research organizations (e.g. “Drive Service Management Adjustments With Peer Comparisons” from the itSMF USA together with Forrester Research, Inc.)

== German chapters ==
There were three books about “ITIL in the Public Sector” (“ITIL in der Öffentlichen Verwaltung”), “Organization Model for the IT in the Public Sector” (“Organizationsmodell für die IT in der Öffentlichen Verwaltung”)) and “Service Level Management in the Public Sector” (“Service Level Management in der Öffentlichen Verwaltung”)).

Annually in December the German chapter celebrates a two-day congress. Topics were provided in different formats with typical keynotes, four or five parallel user sessions, which presents three 20-minute-speeches in a row and a joint discussion, and some open world café discussions.

During the year typical two one day meetings were held – name itSMF Live! - with different, actual topics. A special event for the Public Sector is the event FIT-ÖV.

The chapter award since 2009 the ITSM project of the year. The first awarded project was “ITIL 2010” of the Federal Employment Agency (Bundesagentur für Arbeit, Germany).
