= ISO 10007 =

Published standard on configuration management

ISO 10007 "Quality management — Guidelines for configuration management" is the ISO standard that gives guidance on the use of configuration management within an organization. "It is applicable to the support of products from concept to disposal." The standard was originally published in 1995, and was updated in 2003 and 2017. Its guidance is specifically recommended for meeting "the product identification and traceability requirements" introduced in ISO 9001:2015 and AS9100 Rev D.

== Basic principles ==
ISO 10007 defines a configuration as "interrelated functional and physical characteristics of a product or service as described in the configuration information."

It defines a configuration item as "entity within a configuration that satisfies an end use function".

It defines a configuration baseline as "approved configuration information that establishes the characteristics of a product or service at a point in time that serves as reference for activities throughout the life cycle of the product or service".

It defines configuration status accounting as "formalized recording and reporting of configuration information, the status of proposed changes and the status of the implementation of approved changes".

The standard outlines the responsibilities and authorities and describes the configuration management process that includes the five disciplines of configuration management:

- configuration management planning,
- configuration identification,
- change control,
- configuration status accounting and
- configuration audit.

An annex presents the structure and content of a configuration management plan.

== History ==
In 1979, the Technical Committee ISO/TC 176 "Quality management and quality assurance" started standardization work in the field of quality management and developed the standard ISO 9000.

In 1982, Subcommittee SC 2 "Quality management Systems" was established. SC2 developed ISO 9001 on requirements for quality management systems, ISO 9004 as guidance to achieve sustained success, ISO 10005 as guidance on quality plans, ISO 10006 as guidance on quality management in projects and ISO 10007 as guidance on configuration management.

The first version of ISO 10007 was published in 1995. The second version of ISO 10007 followed in 2003, and the current and third version of ISO 10007 was released in 2017.

== Related standards ==
Mapping ISO 10007:2003 to IEEE Std 828-2012 exists.

Further, ISO 10007 is related to the following standards:

- ISO 9001:2015, Quality management systems — Requirements
- ISO 9004, Managing for the sustained success of an organization — A quality management approach
- ISO 10006, Quality management systems — Guidelines for quality management in projects

== See also ==
- IEEE 828
- Software quality
- Safety-critical system (CM required by safety standards
