= Henri Tudor =

Luxembourgish engineer (1859–1928)

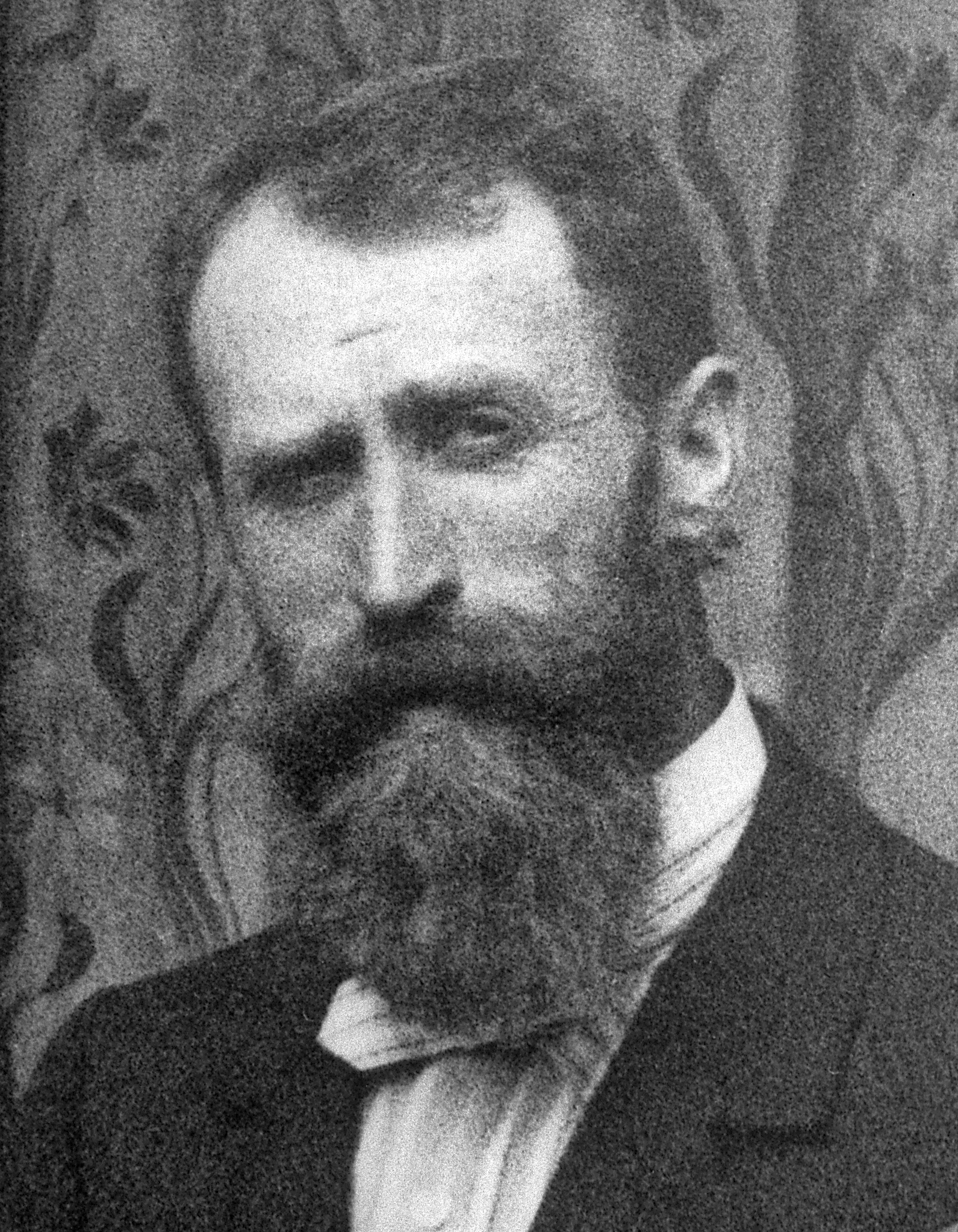
- Tudor in 1899
- Born: Henri Owen Tudor; 30 September 1859; Ferschweiler, Prussia
- Died: 31 May 1928 (aged 68); Rosport, Luxembourg
- Burial place: Rosport cemetery
- Education: École Polytechnique of Brussels University, 1879–1883
- Occupations: Inventor, businessman
- Years active: 1879–1920

Signature
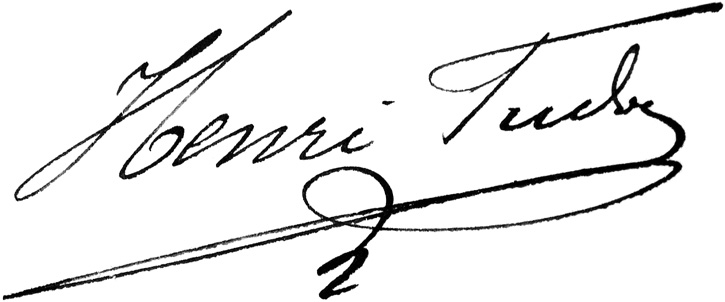

Henri Owen Tudor (30 September 1859 – 31 May 1928) was a Luxembourgish engineer, inventor and industrialist. He developed the first commercially usable lead-acid battery.

== Life ==
Henri Tudor was the son of John Thomas Tudor from Llanarth (United Kingdom) and Marie Loser from Rosport. He attended the primary and secondary school as a boarder at the municipal College of Chimay (Belgium), and was a student from 1879 to 1883 at the École Polytechnique, which was part of Brussels University. In 1885, the young engineer specialised at an electrical engineering institution in Paris, where he attended the lectures given by Marcel Deprez.

Henri Tudor was interested in electricity and especially in its storage. He developed an electric lighting system in his father's residence, the Irminenhof in Rosport, even before he had completed his engineering studies. During his vacations, he connected a Gramme type generator to the water-wheel of the Bannmillen, a mill located on the lower part of the property. Wires carried the electric energy from the mill to the house, which was illuminated with Edison light bulbs. The power supplied by the generator was obviously irregular. Furthermore, it was not used during off-peak hours. Henri Tudor had the idea of using lead acid accumulators as a buffer – to equalise the voltage and to store the unused energy.

The chemical reactions occurring in a lead-acid battery or accumulator were first observed by Wilhelm Josef Sinsteden in 1854. The accumulator as a rechargeable battery was invented in 1859 by Gaston Planté and improved in 1880 by Camille Faure. In its practical applications, it proved however to be unreliable: short circuits occurred and the plates fell apart during service. Thomas Edison described the lead-acid accumulator as a "a catch-penny, ... a mechanism for swindling the public" and "commercially ... a failure."

Henri Tudor sought a permanent solution to these problems and manufactured himself a mould for casting large surface plates with which he built a lead-acid accumulator of his own design. Doing so, he could rely on the help of his brother Hubert, and of his cousin, Nikolaus Schalkenbach of Trier. With the combined equipment – generator and buffer battery – he was able to run continuously and constantly the power supply of the Irminenhof, which thus became the first private home in Luxembourg to have electric lighting.

The Tudor electrode stood out because of its unequalled reliability. We know from a reliable source that a Tudor accumulator was put into service in October 1882 and that it ran without any interruption until December 1887. Accumulator plates having been in regular service during 16 years are exhibited in the Tudor Museum in Rosport.

On 5 May 1891, Henri Tudor married Marie-Madeleine Pescatore of Bofferdange. They had three children and the young family moved in September 1892 into their newly built monumental Manor House in Rosport.

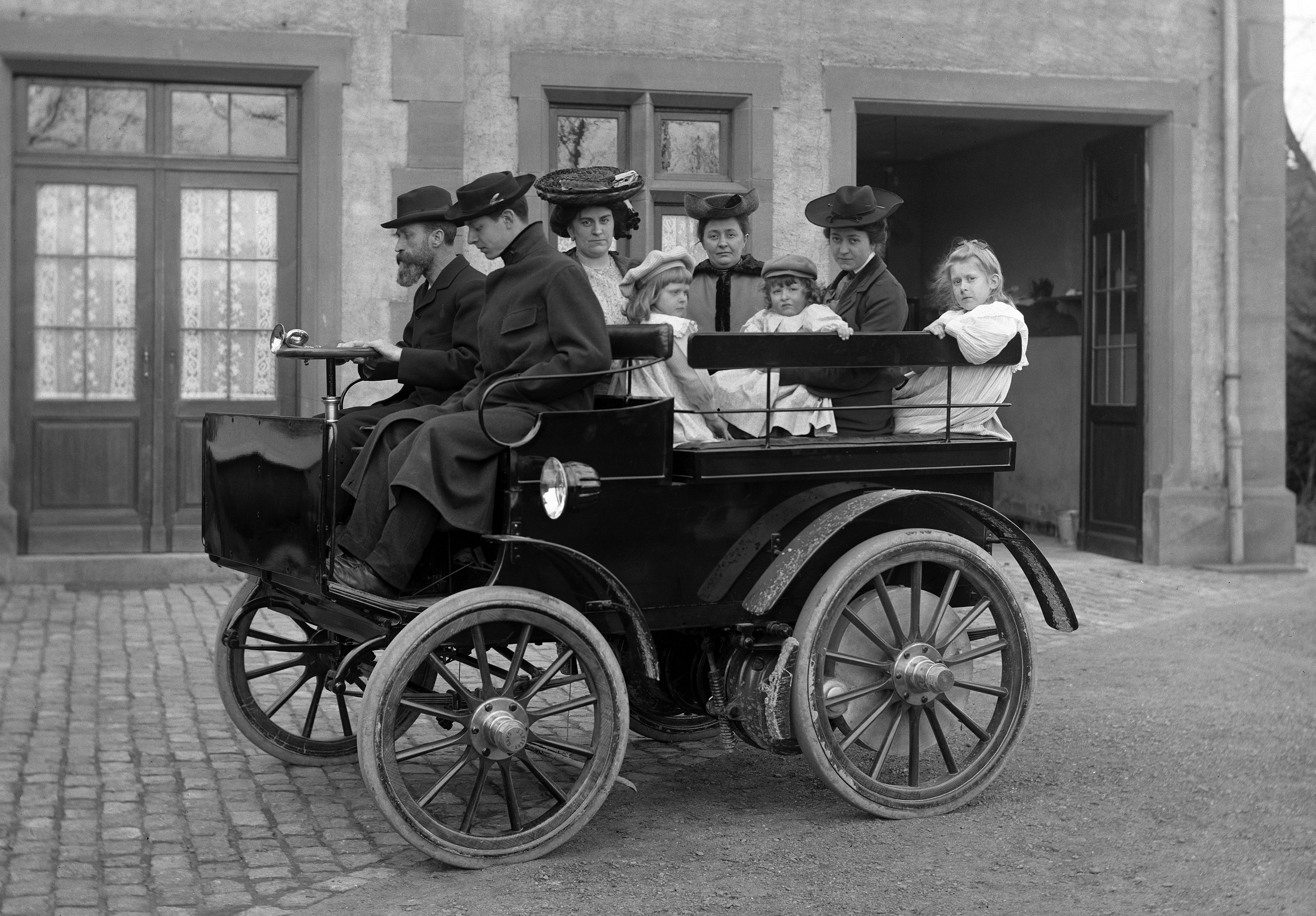
Henri Tudor driving his electric-powered shooting brake built in 1902 by J. Lefert, coachbuilders, in Ghent and – no doubt – equipped with Tudor batteries

In 1914, Henri Tudor began to suffer from a serious lead poisoning, which caused his death on 31 May 1928, aged 68.

== Patents of Henri Tudor ==
The operating principle of the positive electrode of the Tudor accumulator according to the 1886 patent: (a) thin Planté layer, aided by smeared oxide; (b) the Planté layer is strengthened during use, the oxide adhering to the Planté layer swells and shrinks according to the charge and discharge cycles — eventual debris fall into cavities deliberately left below

=== 1886 Patent ===
On 17 July 1886, Henri Tudor filed, in Luxembourg, patent No 711 "Further improvements to the electrodes of electric accumulators". This patent was also filed in Belgium and France.

The improvements consist of the following: The plates (electrodes) are thick enough to be rigid and to provide a high level of conductivity; they are grooved so as to offer a large surface, the grooves being slightly tapered. The plates undergo a formation in accordance with the method developed by Planté but of much shorter duration, the grooves are then filled with a lead oxide paste according to the Faure process (smearing). The plates are then treated with a weak intensity current until the paste is transformed into lead peroxide on the positive plates and into reduced lead on the negative plates. The Planté layer provides a good adhesion of the active paste and the tapered shape of the grooves allows the paste particles to slip during the successive charging and discharging cycles of the battery without causing distortions of the plate. Disintegrated oxide particles fall into cavities deliberately left below the plates. The Planté layer is strengthened during the charging and discharging cycles: the final formation of the Tudor plate happens during the actual use of the accumulator. The Tudor electrode combines the advantages of the Planté and Faure methods while avoiding their respective disadvantages.

=== 1896 Patent ===
In order to avoid the smearing operation, which was laborious and hazardous, Henri Tudor was looking for ways to create a Planté layer by means of an accelerated electrochemical process. On 18 May 1896, he filed, in the United Kingdom, his Patent No 10718 on the electrode coated with a thin layer of oxide. This layer was obtained by reverse electrolysis in very dilute acid in order to promote the formation of "lead oxide containing sulphate", which actually consisted of basic lead sulphates described by the general formula x PbO • y PbSO_{4} • z H_{2}O. This invention led to a weight reduction in the electrodes while increasing their capacity, and resulted in a reduction in the sale price of up to 15 per cent.

== Electric lighting systems ==
On 30 April 1886, Henri Tudor signed a convention with the Town Council of Echternach concerning the replacement of the existing petroleum street by electric lighting. It was understood that the electric power plant would include a steam boiler, two dynamos and Tudor lead-acid accumulators. For the execution of this project, he founded with his brother Hubert and his cousin Nikolaus Schalkenbach, the firm Tudor Frères & Schalkenbach and established workshops in Rosport. The electric lighting system went on stream on 24 October 1886. Echternach was proud to be the first town in the country to benefit from electric lighting.

In 1887, Henri Tudor concluded a contract for electric lighting in the small town of Dolhain-Limbourg (Belgium). In 1889, he founded the Société Anonyme Belge pour l'Éclairage public par l'Électricité in Brussels so as to provide a more solid basis for his business activities in Belgium. He then installed two power stations, one in Brussels and one in Ghent.

In May 1889, 150 public or private stationary Tudor batteries were in operation in Belgium and in the rest of Europe. In July 1891, their number was 1200, which corresponded to more than 3 million electrodes.

Rosport, Tudor's home village, had to wait until 1901 to benefit from electric lighting. The development of direct current networks based on accumulators was inevitably limited and that, in the long term, it even hampered the supply of electricity in its more efficient form: the alternating current.

== Industrial activities ==
=== The Rosport factory ===
The manufacture of Tudor accumulators started in 1885 in the Rosport workshops, installed on the property known as Engelsbuerg. As from January 1897, following the dissolution of the Société Anonyme Franco-Belge pour la fabrication de l’accumulateur Tudor, the Rosport factory manufactured and marketed accumulators not only for Luxembourg but also for Belgium. The workforce exceeded at least occasionally 30 people. From 1899 to 1901, the yearly output exceeded 200 tons. The Rosport factory was unable to cope with the rapid increase in demand and Luxembourg's customs status within the German Customs Union (Zollverein) hampered its development. In 1901, most of the production was transferred to Florival near Wavre. The Rosport factory was shut down in 1908.

=== The emergence of an industrial giant in Germany ===
In 1885, Adolph Müller, commercial representative for the Spiecker & Co. Electric Company in Cologne, travelled to Rosport to get further information on the reliable accumulator running in Rosport already for several years. After spending a few hours with Henri Tudor, Müller was convinced that he had seen with his own eyes an innovation which could be developed on a large scale. The two men agreed to wait until the large-scale street-lighting system in Echternach had been put in place. Once that had passed the test, Müller would begin to market, in Germany, accumulators made in Rosport. On 15 July 1888, Müller concluded an agreement with the Tudor brothers which assigned to the Accumulatoren-Fabrik Tudor'schen Systems Büsche & Müller in Hagen the exclusive right to manufacture and market Tudor accumulators in Germany, central and eastern Europe, and Scandinavia. The agreement also provided for the sharing of technology and licenses. Henri Tudor moved to Hagen to provide technical assistance during the start-up of the factory. He returned to Rosport in late 1888. Two years later, the Accumulatoren-Fabrik Tudor'schen Systems Büsche & Müller, now renamed Büsche & Einbeck, concluded an agreement with Siemens & Halske and AEG to establish a joint-stock company, the Accumulatoren-Fabrik Aktiengesellschaft (AFA). The demand was booming and turnover reached 3 300 000 marks. In 1891, it established a central research laboratory, where Henri Tudor acted as a scientific adviser. The improvements that he made included the negative plate with scraped-off paste and the unitary plate (1891), the development of new foundry moulds for finer grooves (1895–1896) and a solution to the problem of capacity loss observed on negative electrodes (1895–1896). AFA occupied a leading position on the German accumulator market and AFA shares were quoted on the Berlin Stock exchange from 1894 onwards. AFA changed its name in 1962 to Varta Aktiengesellschaft.

=== Industrial activities in Western Europe ===
Henri Tudor took measures to make sure that his accumulator was manufactured and marketed in geographical areas where Adolph Müller had not been assigned any rights.

He granted an operating licence to Piaux, Georgin, Bayeux & Co. in Reims. In 1888, that company began manufacturing Tudor accumulators at its factory in Jonchery-sur-Vesle. On 10 April 1889, he assigned the same rights to the Société Anonyme Belge pour l’Eclairage Public par l’Electricité, which developed a manufacturing site in Faches-Thumesnil, on the outskirts of Lille. It began operations in 1891, and production at Jonchery was discontinued.

In August 1895, the Luxembourger Antoine Bonaventure Pescatore, Henri Tudor's brother-in-law, became the agent for Tudor accumulators in the United Kingdom. Manufacturing began in 1896 in rented premises in a former cotton mill, Barn Meadow Mill, in Dukinfield, a suburb of Manchester. In September 1897, the Dukinfield company was converted into a joint-stock company called The Tudor Accumulator Company Limited, and its registered office was transferred to London, although manufacturing continued in Dukinfield. AFA recognised the importance of the British company for its overseas exports. In April 1902, it purchased the shares in the company held by a Geneva group, and, in 1904, it negotiated the takeover of the entire capital, thereby assuming control of the company.

Just when the Tudor accumulator was about to embark on a spectacular upward trend on European markets, the Rosport factory, where it had all begun, was facing problems. In January 1901, Henri Tudor established in Brussels the Société Anonyme "Accumulateurs Tudor". Its factory in Florival near Wavre opened in July 1901 and production of Tudor accumulators for Belgium was immediately transferred from Rosport to Florival.

Adolph Müller remained one of Henri Tudor's closest friends until his death. He also contributed to the prestige of the Tudor trademark in far-distant lands, thanks to the excellent performance of his company from every point of view. However, with his "friendship agreements", Müller was encroaching more and more upon Tudor territory. That was true in the case of the Netherlands and, shortly afterwards, of Great Britain, where he finally penetrated to the heart of the Dukinfield business. However, AFA never managed to conquer Henri Tudor's final stronghold, the Florival site.

The Tudor companies were deeply affected by the First World War. The Dukinfield site was placed under sequestration in 1917.

After the war, on 1 August 1919, the board of directors of the Société Anonyme "Accumulateurs Tudor" met in Rosport. It noted that the agreement which assigned to AFA the rights to the Netherlands market had expired. It also decided that the Société Anonyme "Accumulateurs Tudor" was entitled to manufacture and export Tudor accumulators to any country in the world without let or hindrance.

=== Industrial activities in Russia ===
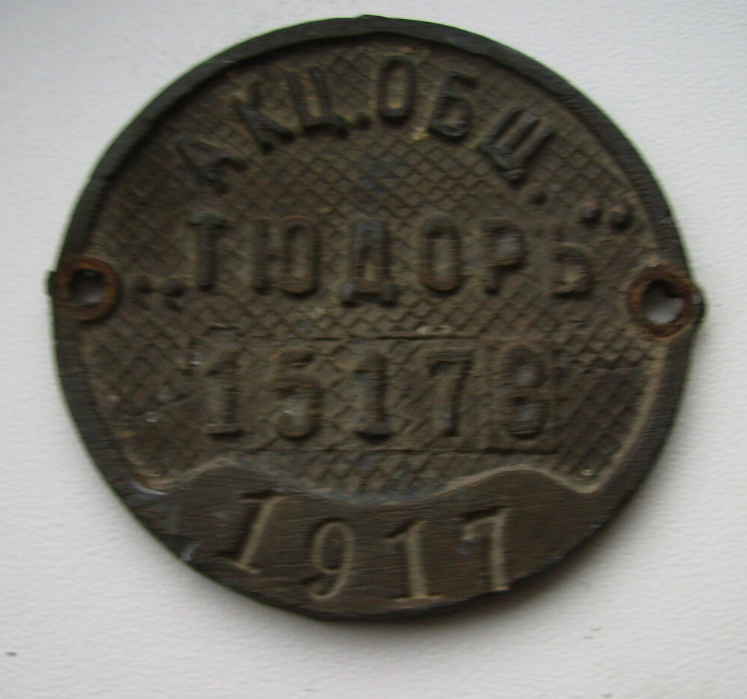
Label from a battery made by the Russian Tudor Accumulator Company, 1917

In 1897, the Russian Tudor Accumulator Company was founded at 1 Pesotskaya Ulitsa, St. Petersburg by Adolph Müller.

== Portable Energy ==
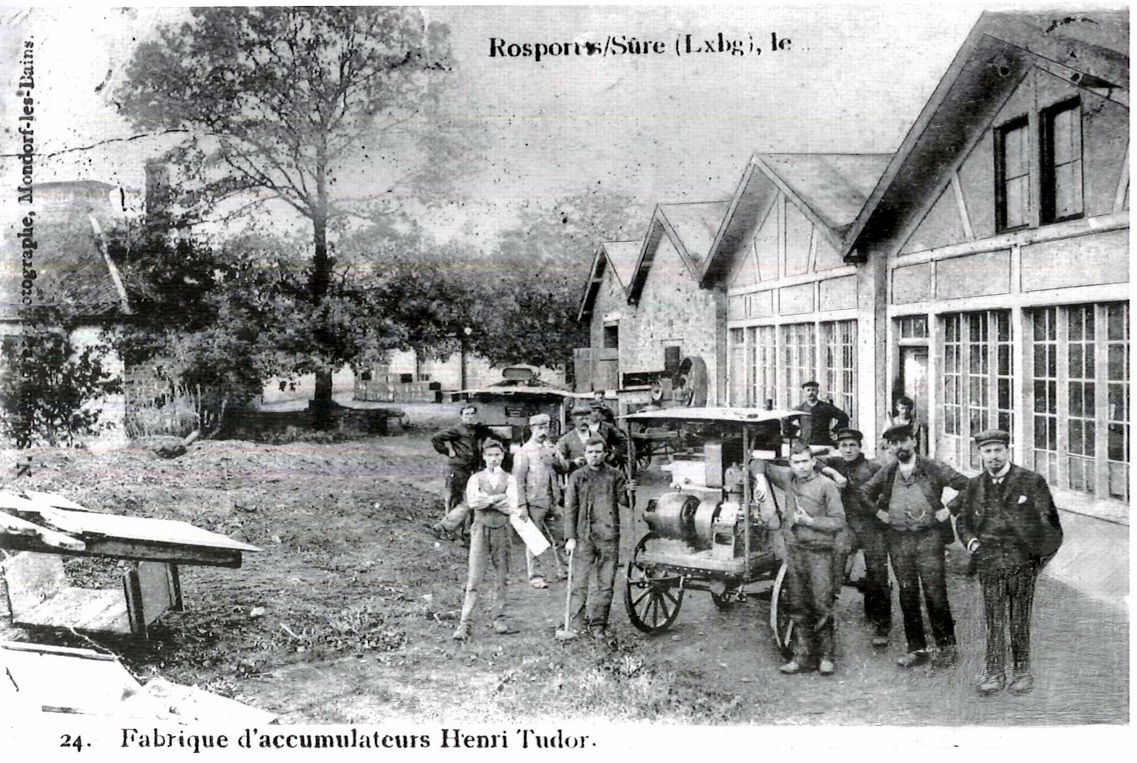
Presenting an Energy-Car in front of the Tudor factory in Rosport

The Tudor brothers from Rosport lived in a rural environment which they wanted to open up to scientific and technological progress. In August 1884, they connected an electric motor to a threshing machine in their father's barn. The energy was fed through cables more than 60 metres (200 ft) long. The first eyewitnesses could not hide their enthusiasm.

The issue of carrying electrical energy to remote countryside locations remained. It was not until 1905, at the Liège Exhibition, that Henri Tudor and the engineer Maurice Braun were able to display a possible solution, designed as a replacement for the traditional portable engine. The cart, which they called an "Energy-Car", was compact and carefully designed. It consisted of an internal combustion engine, a generator, a lead-acid battery and the instruments required to control its operation. It was not a self-propelling vehicle. The device was first built in the Rosport factory, and subsequently at the Braun workshop in Brussels.

The Energy-Car was not a commercial success. The purchase price and maintenance costs were high, and its operation was not straightforward for the uninitiated. A few years later, with the advent of rural electricity grids, the electric motor became predominant on farmsteads, and the Energy-Car became obsolete.

== Legacy ==
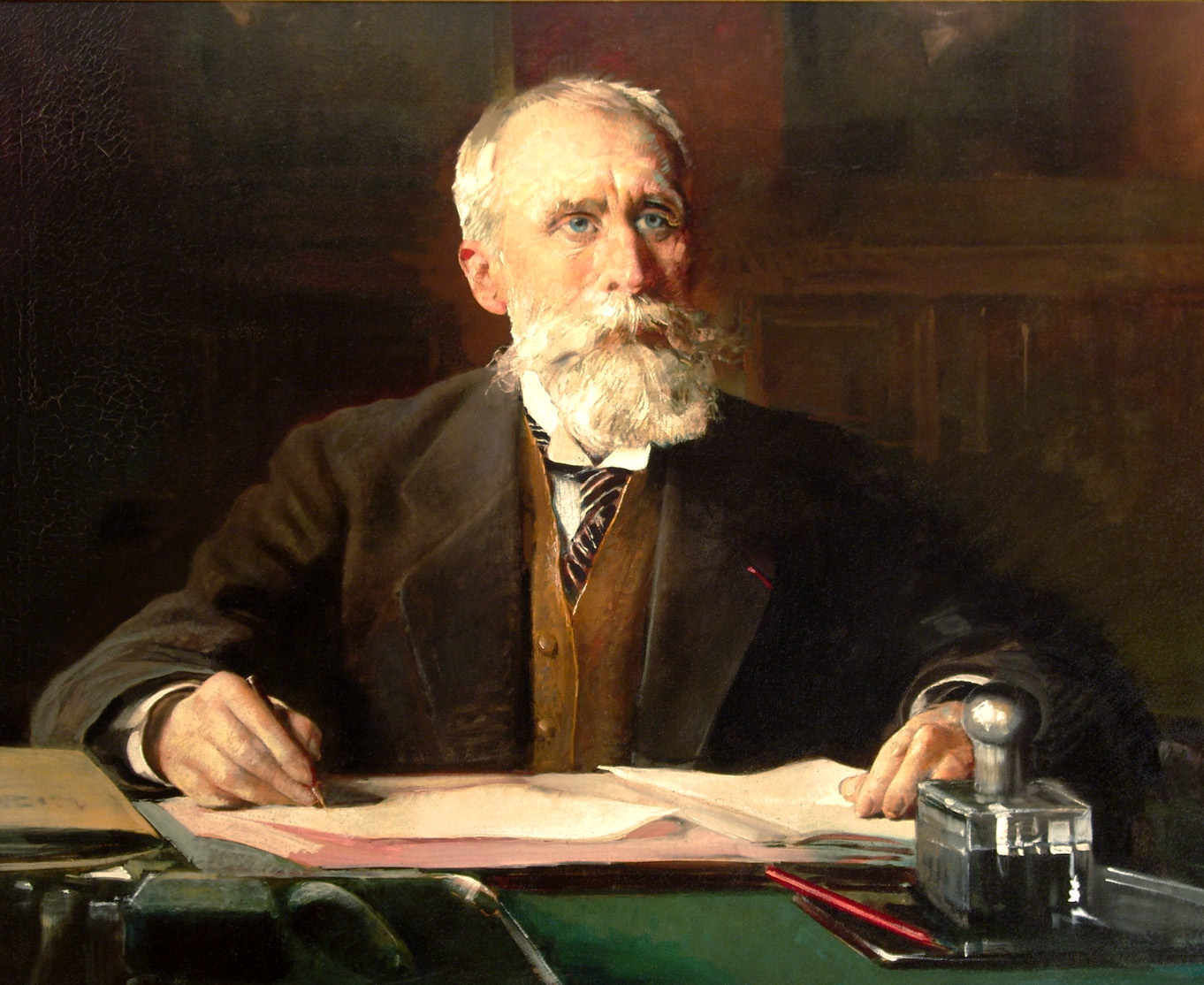
Henri Tudor (1928) by Charles-Joseph Watelet

The Tudor brothers may be considered as the "industrial followers of the theoretical work of Planté".

In 1987, CRP Henri Tudor (the Public Research Centre Henri Tudor) was founded in Luxembourg, and named in honor of Henri Owen Tudor and his devotion to research and innovation.

On 12 May 2009, the Luxembourg Post Office issued a set of three stamps on the theme of "Eminent Luxembourgers". One of the stamps depicted Henri Tudor.

In 2013, the minor planet (260886 Henritudor), discovered in 2005, was named in honour of Henri Tudor.

=== Tudor Museum ===
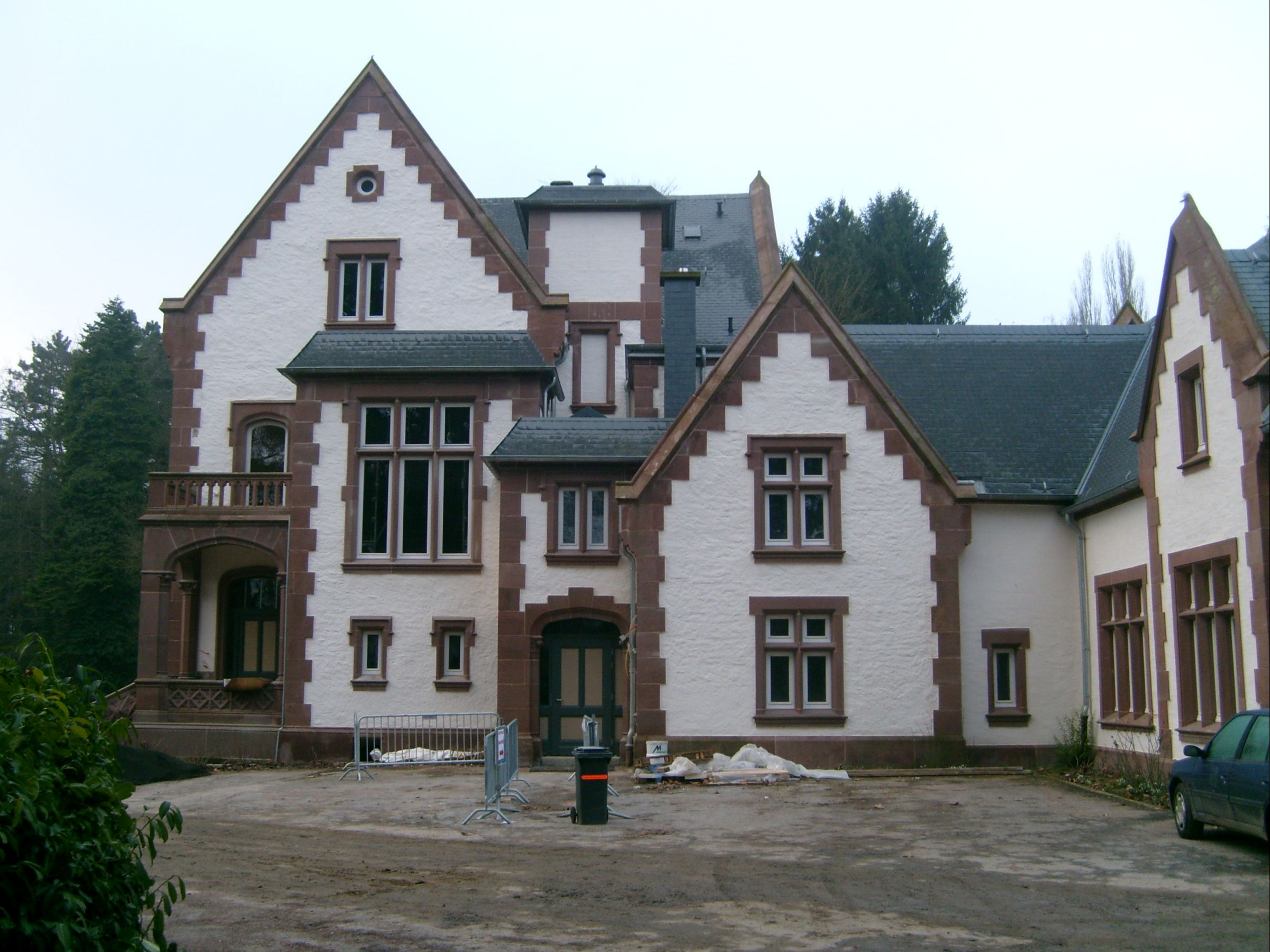
Henri Tudor Museum, Rosport

The house of Henri Tudor is now a museum. In December 2006, the Aldermanic Council of Rosport, consisting of Romain Osweiler, Henri Zeimetz and Patrick Hierthes, published specifications for a "modern and lively museological space focusing on energy and energy storage". The new museum was to concentrate on the inventions of Henri Owen Tudor and their impact on industry, as well as on the man himself, his life, his family and his links with Rosport. The bid from Wieland Schmid from the Mannheim Design Studio caught the eye of the Museum Working Group because of its original approach and educational value. Professor Wolfgang Schmid, from the University of Trier, and the engineers Ernest Reiter and Henri Werner were appointed as advisers. The architect Marcel Niederweis converted the north wing of the Tudor manor house from a number of small rooms walled off from each other into an attractive area flooded with light. The entire population of Rosport. as well as many eminent guests from Luxembourg and abroad, attended the inauguration of the Museum on 23 May 2009.

== Bibliography ==
- Clemens, Oskar, 50 Jahre Accumulatoren-Fabrik Aktiengesellschaft 1888–1938, Berlin 1938, 254 pp.
- Euler, Karl Joachim, 1981, Von Ritter bis Tudor. Zur Erfindung des Bleiakkumulators:Technikgeschichte Bd.48 Nr.1. Verein Deutscher Ingenieure, Düsseldorf
- Hoffmann, Émile, 1959. Henri Owen Tudor, ingénieur, 1858–1928. Commémoration du centième anniversaire de sa naissance: Archives de l'Institut grand-ducal de Luxembourg, Section des Sciences naturelles, physiques et mathématiques, Nouvelle Série 26, 59–80.
- Jumau, L., 1928, Henri Tudor. Ingénieur, Fondateur et Administrateur de l'ancienne Société de l'Accumulateur Tudor. Revue Générale de l'Electricité vol. 24, 132.
- Jumau, L., 1929, Piles et accumulateurs électriques. Collection Armand Colin.
- Linck, Josef, Nikolaus Josef Schalkenbach, ein Trierer Erfinder: Trierisches Jahrbuch, 6. Jg, Trier 1955, 111–114
- Massard, Jos.A.,1886–1996, Hundertzehn Jahre elektrisches Licht in Echternach. Ein Beitrag zur Geschichte der öffentlichen und privaten Beleuchtung im 19. und frühen 20. Jahrhundert in Luxemburg mit Blick ins deutsche Grenzgebiet: Annuaire de la Ville d'Echternach 1997, 101–144.
- Montpellier, J.A., L'Energy-Car: L'Electricien 889(1908),35–38.
- Müller, Adolph, 25 Jahre der Accumulatoren-Fabrik Aktiengesellschaft 1888–1913, Berlin 1913, 376 pp.
- Schallenberg, Richard H., Bottled Energy. Electrical Engineering and the Evolution of Chemical Energy Storage. American Philosophical Society Memoires Vol. 148, Philadelphia 1982, 420 pp.
- Schmid, Wolfgang, Die Brüder Tudor in Rosport. Erfinder, Unternehmer, Jäger und Wanderer. Eifeljahrbuch 2009, 60–64.
- Schmid, Wolfgang / Schmid, Wieland, Henri Tudor – Herkunft und Familie, Akkumulator – Erfindung und Verbreitung, Elektrizität, damals und heute 1859–1928 [catalogue publié lors de l'ouverture du Musée Tudor], Rosport 2009, 70 pp.
- Steinmetz, Aloyse, 1981. Die Tudors in Rosport. Dokumentation über das Leben und die Verdienste der Gebrüder Tudor für ihre Heimatortschaft Rosport. Hrsg. von Lehrer Al. Steinmetz, gelegentlich des 100. Jahrestages des ersten Bleiakkumulators, der von Henri Owen Tudor gebaut wurde und in der alten Mühle des früheren Irminenhofes funktionierte <1881>. Rapid Press, 68 (4) p. Luxembourg.
- Steinmetz, Aloyse, 1995. Henri Owen Tudor konstruierte in Rosport einen elektrischen Bleiakkumulator, der weltweites Aufsehen erregte. Gester an Hätt, 8 (16): 3–11.
- Steinmetz, Aloyse, 1996. Henri Owen Tudor, Pionier auf dem Gebiet der Elektrizität. Heimatkalender 1997 Landkreis Bitburg-Prüm: 26–31.
- Steinmetz, Aloyse, 1998. Henri Owen Tudor, ein bedeutender Pionier unseres Landes. Nos Cahiers, 19 (2–3): 401–422.
- Tudor, Henri / Braun,
