= Relationship management =

In business, relationship management may refer to:

- Customer relationship management
- Supplier relationship management
