= Physical configuration audit =

In computer engineering, a physical configuration audit (PCA) is the formal examination of the "as-built" configuration of a configuration item (CI) against its technical documentation to establish or verify the CI's product baseline. The PCA is used to examine the actual configuration of the CI that is representative of the product configuration, in order to verify that the related design documentation matches the design of the deliverable CI. It is also used to validate many of the supporting processes that the contractor uses in the production of the CI. This is also used to verify that any elements of the CI that were redesigned after the completion of the functional configuration audit also meet the requirements of the CI's performance specification. Additional PCAs may be accomplished later during CI production if circumstances such as the following apply:

- The original production line is "shut down" for several years and then production is restarted.
- The production contract for manufacture of a CI with a fairly complex, or difficult-to-manufacture, design is awarded to a new contractor or vendor.

Re-auditing in these circumstances is advisable regardless of whether the contractor or the government controls the detail production design.

== Software ==
PCA is one of the practices used in software configuration management for software configuration auditing. The purpose of the software PCA is to ensure that the design and reference documentation is consistent with the as-built software product.
