= Service catalog =

Centralized catalog of company services

A service catalog (or catalogue), is an organized and curated collection of business and information technology services within an enterprise.

Service catalogs are knowledge management tools which designate subject matter experts (SMEs) who answer questions and requests related to the listed service. Services in the catalog are usually very repeatable and have controlled inputs, outputs, and procedures.

Service catalogs allow leadership to break the enterprise into highly structured and more efficient operational units, also known as "a service-oriented enterprise."

== Service centralization ==
A service catalog is a means of centralizing all services that are important to the stakeholders of the enterprises which implement and use it. Given its digital and virtual implementation, via software, the service catalog acts, at a minimum, as a digital registry and a means for highly distributed enterprises to see, find, invoke, and execute services regardless of where they exist in the world. This means that people in one part of the world can find and utilize the same services that people in other parts of the world use, eliminating the need to develop and support local services via a federated implementation model.

Centralizing services also acts as a means of identifying service gaps and redundancies that can then be addressed by the enterprise to improve itself.

== Service catalog composition ==
Service catalogs are implemented in a manner that facilitate the registration, discovery, request, execution, and tracking of desired services for catalog users. Each service within the catalog typically includes traits and elements such as:

- Clear ownership of and accountability for the service (a person and often an organization).
- A name or identification label for the service.
- A description of the service.
- A service categorization or type that allows it to be grouped with other similar services.
- Related service request types.
- Any supporting or underpinning services.
- Who is entitled to request/view the service.
- Associated costs (if any).
- How to request the service and how its delivery is fulfilled.
- Escalation points and key contacts.

The more descriptive the service details are, the easier it is for end users of the service catalog to find and invoke the services they desire.

== Catalog categories ==
A service catalog is commonly structured in a manner where its registered services are categorized. A large percentage of Categories for services are derived from the areas of an enterprise and the functions it performs, such as Information Technology, Operations, and Fulfillment. Examples of common service categories include Marketing Services, Product Development Services, Fulfillment Services, and Support Services, which are consumed and performed by most businesses.

The purpose of categorization of services is to facilitate service curation, such as how books may be curated in a library.

== Resource management ==
The utilization of service catalogs allow enterprises to allocate and track resources, both human and systemic, which are required for successful service delivery, operations, and support. This allows enterprises to understand where resources are allocated, whether there are too many or too few resources allocated, and whether or not the resources allocated are adequate for purpose. It also allows an understanding of what resources are shared between multiple services versus those that are fully dedicated to a single service.

== Metrics driven transparency ==
Benefits of implementing and maintaining a service catalog include allowing an enterprise to track and manage metrics that represent the utilization of services and service-related traits, such as those associated with service supply and demand. For example, enterprises can track and measure:

- Services that are most and least used (i.e. enterprise service demand)
- Services that are successfully delivering versus those that struggle to deliver (i.e. enterprise service supply)
- How many service requests are being invoked for each service (i.e. service-specific demand)
- How many service deliverables are making it to their targeted service requestors (i.e. service-specific supply)
- Who invokes what services most or least
- How much time it takes to approve service requests
- How much time it takes to deliver service outputs, once requests are approved
- Service finances, such as how much is spent on each service by those who invoke them and those who provide them

In addition to the above, a service catalog also helps leadership and management better see and understand correlations of service related work, assets, and resources to the people, organizations, and projects that request them.

== IT service catalog ==
An IT service catalog is a subset of an enterprise service catalog and is defined by ITIL, by the book Service Design, to be an exhaustive list of IT-only services that an organization provides or offers to its employees or customers. The catalog is the only part of the Service Portfolio that is published to customers and is used to support the sale and/or delivery of IT services.

== A user's perspective ==
A user goes to a website to search for a specific service, such as requesting a new laptop, requesting a change in benefits, or adding a new employee to a department. The service catalog site groups services by category and allows for searching (especially when hundreds or thousands of services are available). The user selects a desired service and sees the description and details. The user enters any pertinent information (contact information, service-specific questions) and submits the request for service. The request requires approval, and goes through routing, service-level management, and other processes necessary to fulfill the request. The user may return to the site later to check on the status of a request, or to view overall metrics on how well the organization is performing the services it provides.

== A business unit manager's perspective ==
Business Unit Managers determine what services to "publish" to end-users via the service catalog. Business Unit Managers and Analysts would determine what questions are to be asked of the user, any approvals necessary for a request, and what other systems or processes are needed to fulfill the request. Once the service is defined and the fulfillment process organized, these people or a more technical employee would build the requisite functionality into the service definition and then publish this to the service catalog.

== Service catalogs for cloud computing services ==
The use of a service catalog for cloud computing services is an integral part of deploying services on private and public clouds. Users wishing to consume cloud services would use a cloud service catalog to view what cloud services are available, their function, and know the technologies used to provide the services.

Users would also see the available different service level options based on latency and reliability. With this knowledge, users are able to change the configuration of the technologies used to deliver the services based on cost, performance and technology improvements.

By seeing and understanding the different services available through the cloud users can better appreciate what is available to them, compared to traditional IT whereby one group of users or business unit may be unaware of the technologies available to another unit.

Accessed by self-service portals, service catalogs contain a list of cloud services from which cloud consumers select for self-provisioning of cloud services. This removes the need for users to work through various IT departments in order to provision a cloud service, nor are users required to provide detailed IT specifications. They are only required to provide business and organization requirements.

To make selection easier and to speed service deployment, service definitions are often standardized in cloud service catalogs. This presents three benefits: improved capacity planning, particularly if standard components are used; quicker service provisioning; and better buying forecasts which helps to lower costs.

Automation is an aspect of cloud service catalog that has been noted. Cloud service catalogs have been described as enabling "cloud on auto-pilot" enabling cloud users to build cloud services based on pre-built templates selected from catalogs.

== See also ==
- IT Governance
- ITIL
- IT Service Management
