= Luxembourg Institute of Science and Technology =

Public research institute in Belvaux, Luxembourg

Coordinates: 43°30′07″N 5°56′56″E

The Luxembourg Institute of Science and Technology (LIST) is a leading European research centre focusing on natural and engineering sciences in Luxembourg and the Greater Region.

With 840 employees - nearly 80% of them researchers - LIST is involved in science across natural, built, and industrial environments, as well as in space, artificial intelligence, security and defense.

LIST bridges fundamental and applied research and develops prototypes and market-ready solutions that empower industry, government and society.

Through strong partnerships with public and private stakeholders, LIST accelerates technology transfers, fosters collaboration, strengthens Luxembourg’s global competitiveness and supports a sustainable and resilient future.
