= IT service management =

Management of information technology services that meet the needs of a business

Information technology service management (ITSM) is the set of activities performed by an organization to design, build, deliver, operate, and control IT services offered to customers.

Unlike more technology-oriented IT management approaches like network management and IT systems management, IT service management is characterized by a process approach toward management, focusing on customer needs and IT services for customers rather than IT systems, and stressing continual improvement. The CIO WaterCooler's 2017 ITSM report states that business uses ITSM "mostly in support of customer experience (35%) and service quality (48%)."

== Process ==
Organizational ITSM process execution, especially for workflows, can benefit significantly from being supported with specialized software tools.

=== Service desk ===
A service desk is a primary IT function within the discipline of IT service management (ITSM) as defined by ITIL. It is intended to provide a Single Point of Contact (SPOC) to meet the communication needs of both users and IT staff, and to satisfy both customer and IT provider objectives. User refers to the actual user of the service, while customer refers to the entity that is paying for the service. ITSM tools are frequently applied to other aspects of business; this practice is often called enterprise service management (ESM). A key initiative in ITSM is the automation of routine tasks, enabling personnel to focus on higher-priority responsibilities; this is known as IT process automation.

The ITIL approach considers the service desk to be the central point of contact between service providers and users/customers on a day-to-day basis. It is also a focal point for reporting incidents (disruptions or potential disruptions in service availability or quality) and for submitting service requests (routine requests for services).

ITIL regards a call center or help desk as similar kinds of tech support which provide only a portion of what a service desk can offer. A service desk has a broader and user-centered approach which is designed to provide the user with an informed single point of contact for all IT activities. A service desk facilitates the integration of business processes into the service management infrastructure. In addition to actively monitoring and owning incidents and user questions, and providing the communications channel for other service management disciplines with the user community, a service desk also provides an interface for other activities such as customer change requests, third parties (e.g. maintenance contracts), and software licensing. Computer emergency response teams (CERT) are specifically dedicated to computer security incidents.

== Frameworks ==
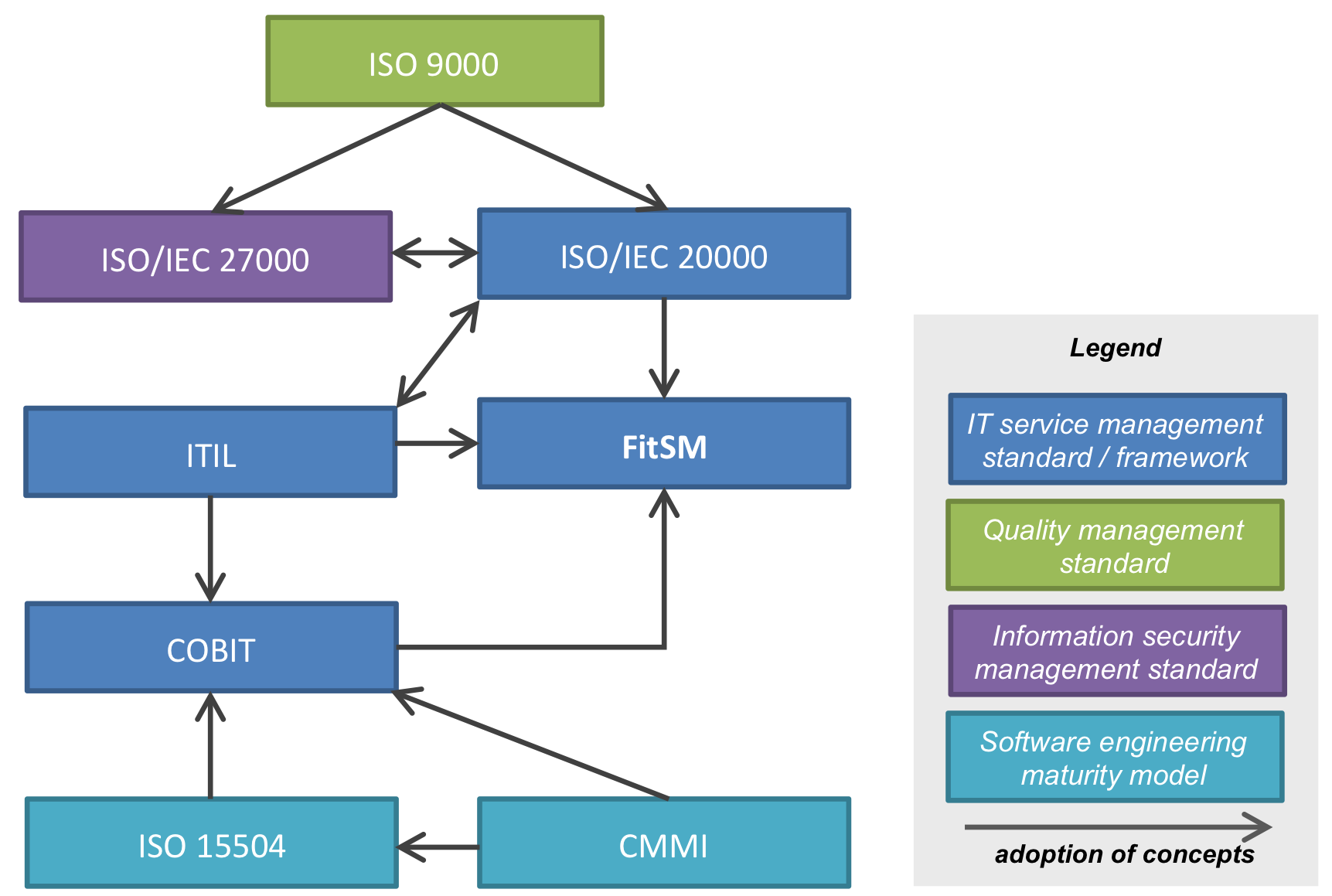
Relationships between ITSM frameworks and other management standards

ITSM is similar to other IT and general management approaches, especially information security management and software engineering. Consequently, IT service management frameworks have been influenced by other standards and adopted concepts from them, e.g. CMMI, ISO 9000, or ISO/IEC 27000.

Various frameworks for ITSM and overlapping disciplines include:

- ITIL (Information Technology Infrastructure Library) is a set of detailed practices for IT activities such as IT service management (ITSM) and IT asset management (ITAM) that focus on aligning IT services with business needs and goals.
- TOGAF is a framework and methodology that aims to define business goals while aligning them with architecture objectives related to software development.
- Business Process Framework (eTOM) is a process framework for telecommunications service providers.
- COBIT (Control Objectives for Information and Related Technologies) is an IT governance framework that specifies control objectives, metrics, and maturity models. Recent versions have aligned the naming of select control objectives to established ITSM process names.
- FitSM is a standard for lightweight service management. Its criteria includes auditable requirements, document templates, and other resources that are published under Creative Common licenses. Its basic process framework is in large parts aligned to that of ISO/IEC 20000.
- CMMI helps service providers establish, manage, and improve services to meet business goals.
- ASL's goal is the professional development of application management. This is achieved by offering a framework within which the processes of application management are brought in relation to each other.
- USM, the principle-based USM method provides a standardized management system for a service organization to manage its people, its processes, its technology, and its services, based on an explicit service management architecture.USM specifies the management system that supports the practice-based frameworks and standards and is adopted by the Dutch government for its management architecture.
- ISO/IEC 20000 is an international standard for managing and delivering IT services. Its process model bears many similarities to that of ITIL version 2, since BS 15000 (precursor of ISO/IEC 20000) and ITIL were mutually aligned with version 2 of ITIL. ISO/IEC 20000 defines minimum requirements for an effective "service management system" (SMS). Conformance of the SMS to ISO/IEC can be audited and organizations can achieve an ISO/IEC 20000 certification of their SMS for a defined scope.
- BiSL is a best practices framework for the Information Management domain.
- MOF (Microsoft Operations Framework) includes both a general framework of service management functions and guidance on managing services based on Microsoft technologies.

== Professional organizations ==
There are international, chapter-based professional associations, such as the IT Service Management Forum (itSMF), and HDI. These organizations' main goal is to foster the exchange of experiences and ideas between ITSM users. To this end, national and local itSMF and HDI chapters (LIGs or local interest groups for itSMF) organize conferences and workshops. Some of them also contribute to the translation of ITSM framework documents into their respective languages or publish their own ITSM guides. There are several service management certifications that include, but are not limited to, ITILv4, TOGAF or COBIT.

== See also ==
- Customer service
- Network and service management taxonomy
- ISO/IEC 33001 Information technology -- Process assessment -- Concepts and terminology (software development)
- Incident management § IT service management
