= Business Information Services Library =

Business Information Services Library (BiSL), previously known as Business Information Service Management Library, is a framework used for information management.

BiSL is a public domain standard since 2005, governed by the ASL BiSL foundation (previously ASL Foundation) which ceased to exist in 2020. The framework describes a standard for processes within business information management at the strategy, management and operations level. BiSL is closely related to the ITIL and ASL framework, yet the main difference between these frameworks is that ITIL and ASL focus on the supply side of information (the purpose of an IT organisation), whereas BiSL focuses on the demand side (arising from the end-user organisation).

== History ==
BiSL was originally developed in the Netherlands by RCC/Roccade Atribit. It was first described by Deurloo c.s. in an article "Model voor Functioneel Beheer", in the Dutch annual 'IT Beheer Jaarboek', edition 1998, pages 131-140 (ed. J. van Bon, Ten Hagen & Stam Uitgevers). Later, it was adopted by the ASL-BiSL Foundation, founded in 2002. The ASL-BiSL Foundation ceased to exist in 2020 and BiSL was rebranded to Digital Information Design.

== BiSL in IT demand management ==
Based on the separation of duties, Information Delivery can be split in two areas:

- IT Management representing 'Supply'

IT Management is the domain that builds and runs the information systems. It is composed of various disciplines, including Systems Management, Application Management (framed by ASL), Facility Management, and IT Service Management (framed by ITIL).

- Information Management representing 'Demand'

Information Management is the domain that frames the specification of the functional requirements that the IT services have to deliver to the end-users, the management of the corporate data model, and the management of the delivery of IT services by IT management. Information Management is supported by the most recent BiSL standard.
