= Functional management =

Organizational strategy in corporate environments

Functional management is the most common type of organizational management. The organization is grouped by areas of speciality within different functional areas (e.g., finance, marketing, and engineering). Some refer to a functional area as a "silo". Besides the heads of a firm's product and/or geographic units the company's top management team typically consists of several functional heads such as the chief financial officer, the chief operating officer, and the chief strategy officer. Communication generally occurs within a single department. If information or project work is needed from another department, a request is transmitted up to the department head, who communicates the request to the other department head. Otherwise, communication stays within the department. Team members complete project work in addition to normal department work.

The main advantage of this type of organization is that each employee has only one manager, thus simplifying the chain of command.

== See also ==
- A Guide to the Project Management Body of Knowledge (PMBOK Guide), Project Management Institute, ISBN 1-880410-23-0
- Matrix management
- Management science
- Organizational structure
