= ITIL =

Set of practices for Information Technology (IT) development, management and support

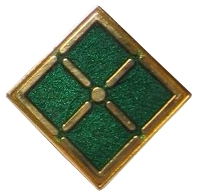

ITIL (formerly and also known as Information Technology Infrastructure Library) is a framework with a set of practices (formerly processes) for information technology (IT) activities such as IT service management (ITSM) and IT asset management (ITAM) that focus on aligning IT services with the needs of a business.

ITIL describes best practices, including processes, procedures, tasks, and checklists which are not organization- or technology-specific. It is designed to allow organizations to establish a baseline and can be used to demonstrate compliance and to measure improvements. Other similar frameworks exist, such as the Microsoft Operations Framework.

There is no formal independent third-party compliance assessment available to demonstrate ITIL compliance in an organization. Certification in ITIL is only available to individuals and not organizations. Since 2021, the ITIL trademark is owned by PeopleCert.

== History ==
Responding to growing dependence on IT, the UK Government's Central Computer and Telecommunications Agency (CCTA) in the 1980s developed a set of recommendations designed to standardize IT management practices across government functions, built around a process model-based view of controlling and managing operations often credited to W. Edwards Deming and his plan-do-check-act (PDCA) cycle.

- In 1989, ITIL was released. It grew to a series of 30 books that recommended and provided IT best practices that focused on and catered for client and business needs.
- In 1993, the examination institute EXIN developed the first certification scheme for ITIL.
- In April 2001, the CCTA was merged into the Office of Government Commerce (OGC), an office of the UK Treasury.
- In 2001, ITIL version 2 was released.
- In May 2007, ITIL version 3 was released (also known as the ITIL Refresh Project) consisting of 26 processes and functions, now grouped into only 5 volumes, arranged around the concept of Service lifecycle structure. ITIL Version 3 is now known as ITIL 2007 Edition.
- In 2009, the OGC officially announced that ITIL Version 2 certification would be withdrawn and launched a major consultation as per how to proceed.
- In 2009 and 2011, researchers investigated the benefits of the ITIL implementation.
- In July 2011, ITIL 2011 was released.
- In 2013, ITIL was acquired by AXELOS, a joint venture between Capita and the UK Cabinet Office.
- In February 2019, ITIL 4 was released. With this release, the nomenclature of using a version number was replaced simply with the numerical number (v3 became 4) in a reference to the 4th industrial revolution. The main changes were: to consider end-to-end Service Management from holistic and value-centric perspectives, to align with philosophies such as Agile, DevOps, and Lean, and to reduce the emphasis on IT Service Management in favor of general Service Management.
- In June 2021, PeopleCert completed the acquisition of AXELOS.
- In January 2026, PeopleCert announced ITIL 5

== Guiding principles ==
ITIL 5 contains seven guiding principles:

- Focus on value
- Start where you are
- Progress iteratively with feedback
- Collaborate and promote visibility
- Think and work holistically
- Keep it simple and practical
- Optimize and automate

== Framework content ==
ITIL 5 consists of the following 34 practices:

- Product and service management practices
  - Availability management
  - Business analysis
  - Capacity and performance management
  - Change enablement
  - Deployment management
  - Incident management
  - Information security management
  - Infrastructure and platform management
  - IT asset management
  - Monitoring and event management
  - Problem management
  - Release management
  - Service catalogue management
  - Service configuration management
  - Service continuity management
  - Service design
  - Service desk
  - Service financial management
  - Service level management
  - Service request management
  - Service validation and testing
  - Software development and management
- General management practices
  - Architecture management
  - Continual improvement
  - Knowledge management
  - Measurement and reporting
  - Organizational change management
  - Portfolio management
  - Project management
  - Relationship management
  - Risk management
  - Strategy management
  - Supplier management
  - Workforce and talent management

For each practice, ITIL identifies generic processes, roles, metrics, and software which may be adopted by an organisation seeking to implement the practice.

== Certification ==
ITIL 4 certification can be obtained by different roles in IT management. Certification starts with ITIL 4 Foundation, followed by one of two branches:

=== ITIL 4 Managing Professional ===
- ITIL 4 Specialist: Create, Deliver & Support (CDS)
- ITIL 4 Specialist: Drive Stakeholder Value (DSV)
- ITIL 4 Specialist: High Velocity IT (HVIT)
- ITIL 4 Specialist: Monitor, Support, and Fulfil (MSF)

=== ITIL 4 Strategic Leader ===
- ITIL 4 Strategist: Direct, Plan & Improve (DPI)
- ITIL 4: Digital & IT Strategy (DITS)

== See also ==
- Application Services Library – A similar framework for application management
- Business Information Services Library (BiSL) – A similar framework for information management and functional management
- ISO/IEC 20000 – An international standard for IT service management
- Tudor IT Process Assessment – A framework for assessment of IT service management maturity
