= Apache CloudStack =

Open-source cloud computing software

CloudStack
- Original authors: Cloud.com, Citrix
- Developer: Apache Software Foundation
Stable release
- 4.21.x (LTS): 4.21.0.0 / August 24, 2025; 14 months ago
- 4.17.x (LTS): 4.17.2.0 / December 16, 2022; 3 years ago
- Written in: Java (primarily), Python
- Platform: Java
- Type: Cloud computing
- License: Apache License 2.0
- Website: cloudstack.apache.org
- Repository: CloudStack Repository

CloudStack is open-source Infrastructure-as-a-Service cloud computing software for creating, managing, and deploying infrastructure cloud services. It uses existing hypervisor platforms for virtualization, such as KVM, VMware vSphere, including ESXi and vCenter, XenServer/XCP and XCP-ng. In addition to its own API, CloudStack also supports the Amazon Web Services (AWS) API and the Open Cloud Computing Interface from the Open Grid Forum.

== History ==
CloudStack was originally developed by Cloud.com, formerly known as VMOps.

VMOps was founded by Sheng Liang, Shannon Williams, Alex Huang, Will Chan, and Chiradeep Vittal in 2008. The company raised a total of $17.6M in venture funding from Redpoint Ventures, Nexus Ventures and Index Ventures (Redpoint and Nexus led the initial Series A funding round). The company changed its name from VMOps to Cloud.com on May 4, 2010, when it emerged from stealth mode by announcing its product. Cloud.com was based in Cupertino, California.

In May 2010, Cloud.com released most of CloudStack as free software under the GNU General Public License, version 3 (GPLv3). They kept about 5% proprietary. Cloud.com and Citrix both supported OpenStack, another Apache-licensed cloud computing program, at its announcement in July 2010.

In October 2010, Cloud.com announced a partnership with Microsoft to develop the code to provide integration and support of Windows Server 2008 R2 Hyper-V to the OpenStack project.

Citrix Systems purchased Cloud.com on July 12, 2011, for approximately $200 million. In August 2011, Citrix released the remaining code under the Apache Software License with further development governed by the Apache Foundation. In February 2012, Citrix released CloudStack 3.0. Among other features, this added support for Swift, OpenStack's S3-like object storage solution.

In April 2012, Citrix donated CloudStack to the Apache Software Foundation (ASF), where it was accepted into the Apache Incubator; Citrix changed the license to the Apache License version 2. As part of this change, Citrix also ceased their involvement in OpenStack. On November 6, 2012, CloudStack 4.0.0-incubating was announced, the first stable release after joining ASF. On March 20, 2013, CloudStack graduated from Apache Incubator and became a Top-Level Project (TLP) of ASF. The first stable (maintenance) release after graduation is CloudStack 4.0.2.

== Key features ==
- Rich user-interface
- noVNC-based VM console
- Built-in high-availability for hosts and VMs
- Hypervisor-agnostic
- Multiple storage options including block and shared storage support
- Snapshot management
- Usage metering
- Network management (VLAN, security groups)
- Virtual routers, firewalls, load balancers
- Multi-role support
- LDAP, SAML, 2FA
- End-to-end encryption including secured console, volume and database encryption
- AWS API compatibility

== Supported Hypervisors ==
Hypervisor	Version	EOL (End Of Life)
VMware vSphere	6.5	15/10/2022
VMware vSphere	6.7	15/10/2022
VMware vSphere	7.0	02/04/2025
VMware vSphere	8.0	11/10/2029
Citrix Hypervisor	7.1	12/12/2023
Citrix Hypervisor	7.2	12/12/2023
Citrix Hypervisor	7.4	12/12/2023
Citrix Hypervisor	7.5	12/12/2023
Citrix Hypervisor	8.0	25/07/2025
XCP-ng	7.4	31/12/2018
XCP-ng	7.6	30/03/2020
XCP-ng	8.0	13/11/2020
XCP-ng	8.1	31/03/2021
XCP-ng	8.2	25/06/2025
Centos / Red Hat KVM	7	30/08/2021
Centos / Red Hat KVM	8	31/05/2029
Rocky/Alma Linux / Red Hat KVM	9	31 May 2034
Ubuntu / KVM	18	2028
Ubuntu / KVM	20	2030
Ubuntu / KVM	22	2027
Opensuse Leap / KVM	15	04/01/2022
Suse Linux Enterprise Server	15	31/07/2028
Rocky Linux	8	2029
Red Hat / LXC	7	30/08/2021
Microsoft Hyper-V	2012 R2	10/10/2023

== BareMetal hosts ==
- RHEL or CentOS, v7.x
- Ubuntu 16.04

== Deployment architecture ==
The minimum production installation consists of one machine running the CloudStack Management Server and another machine to act as the cloud infrastructure (in this case, a very simple infrastructure consisting of one host running hypervisor software). In its smallest deployment, a single machine can act as both the Management Server and the hypervisor host (using the KVM hypervisor).

Multiple management servers can be configured for redundancy and load balancing, all pointing to a common MySQL database.

== Users ==
In July 2012 it was reported that Datapipe launched the largest international public cloud to be built on CloudStack, which included 6 data centers in the US, Britain, and Asia.
