= Ratmir Timashev =

Russian information technology executive (born 1966)

- Ратмир Тимашев
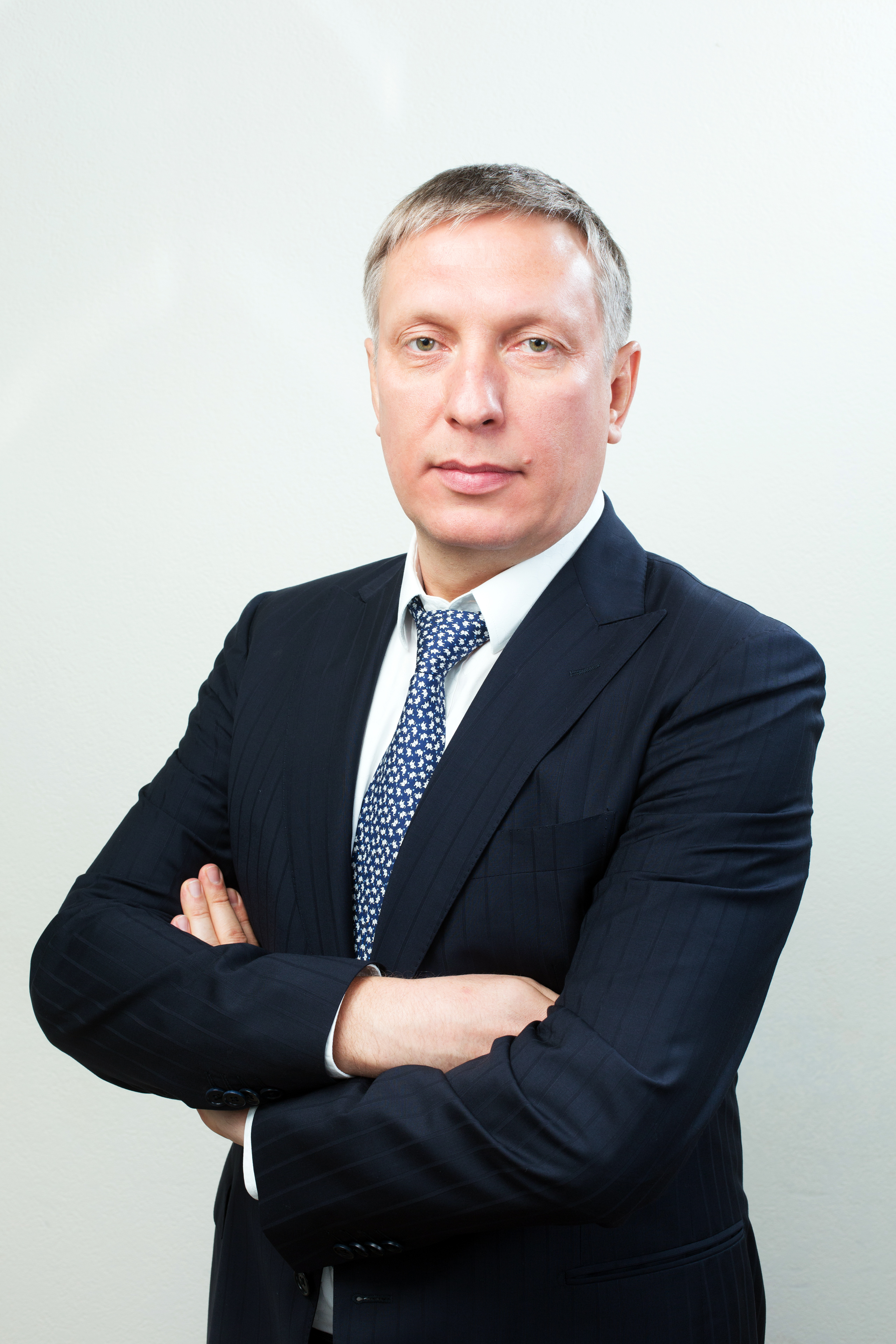
- Born: 26 June 1966 (age 60); Ufa, Russian SFSR, Soviet Union
- Education: Moscow Institute of Physics and Technology, Ohio State University
- Occupation: Entrepreneur
- Known for: Co-Founder of Veeam Software
- Spouse: Angela Timashev
- Children: 2

Ratmir Vilyevich Timashev (Russian: Ратмир Вильевич Тимашев; born 26 June 1966) is a Russian-born, American IT entrepreneur, and founder and former CEO of Veeam Software.

Following the sale of Veeam to Insight Partners, Timashev launched Object First, an S3-compatible object storage startup in 2022.

He was listed in The Top 25 Innovators of the Year by CRN Magazine in 2015 and won a Silver Stevie Award for Executive of the Year — Computer Services. Timashev is based in Connecticut. In January 2024, he renounced his Russian citizenship.

== Early life and education ==
Ratmir Timashev was born in Ufa, Russian SFSR, in 1966. He is a 1990 graduate of the Moscow Institute of Physics and Technology. Ratmir is of Tatar descent.

Timashev immigrated to the United States in 1992 to attend the chemical physics program at Ohio State University, graduating with a master's degree in chemical physics in 1996. At OSU he worked under the supervision of Dr. Terry Miller, Ohio Eminent Scholar Professor Emeritus, and Dr. George McBane.

== Career ==
In 1995, while still a graduate student at OSU, he started his first business with his college roommate, Andrei Baronov. The first business established by Timashev was an internet e-commerce start-up. With his partner, Baronov, he built an online store to sell computer parts. Later in 1996, the two partners created several tools for Windows NT administrators and these tools' sales soon exceeded the revenue from the computer parts' sales, which led Timashev to start a new company, Aelita Software. Started in 1997, Aelita Software, was focused on Windows Server systems management and monitoring software. Over the next eight years, Aelita grew to $30 million in sales. At the beginning of 2004, the company was sold to its prime competitor, Quest Software, for about $115 million. Timashev then became a General Manager at Quest Software, overseeing the new Windows Enterprise Management business unit. He left Quest Software at the beginning of 2005.

In late 2005, Timashev realized the potential of virtualization technologies. He decided to do something similar to what he and Baronov had done for Windows NT, but for the virtual environment instead. In 2006, Timashev started a new company that he named Veeam Software. The first Veeam products were designed for managing and monitoring the VMware ESX virtualization platform. In 2008 the company released a backup tool called Veeam Backup & Replication. The tool soon became Veeam's flagship product and helped the company enter the backup market.

By the end of 2015, Veeam Software employed more than 1,950 people worldwide and reported $474 million in revenue.

In 2011, Forbes magazine included Timashev among the top 30 IT businessmen in Russia. In 2016 Kommersant listed him in the top 100 Russian Internet millionaires. In 2018, Forbes had him as 116th among the 200 richest businessmen in Russia with a fortune of $950 million.

== Personal life and Philanthropy ==
Timashev currently resides in Greenwich, Connecticut with his family.

In 2017, Timashev and his wife, Angela, established the Timashev Family Foundation to support arts education, entrepreneurship, and other causes.

As part of Timashev's efforts to promote tech entrepreneurship in Ohio, the Foundation pledged $110 million to establish the Center for Software Innovation at the Ohio State University in 2023.

== Venture activities ==
Since 2004, Timashev and Baronov started investing in information technology companies that develop internet and software products. They established ABRT Venture Fund (the name ABRT came from the first letters of the founders’ names: Andrei Baronov and Ratmir Timashev). The company mainly invests in eastern and central European-based companies. The fund invests in startup companies, provides its own specialists to enable sales, marketing and other necessary activities, and then exits on IPO or a company's sale stage. In 2014, Timashev and Baronov transferred ownership of the fund to a new generation of investors.

In 2022, Timashev and Baronov launched Object First, an S3-compatible object storage startup.

In 2024, Timashev co-founded Integrail (later rebranded in June 2025 as EverWorker), an AI platform that helps mid-sized businesses and non-technical users automate business tasks using large language model (LLM)-agnostic AI agents.
