= Veeam Backup & Replication =

Backup and disaster recovery software

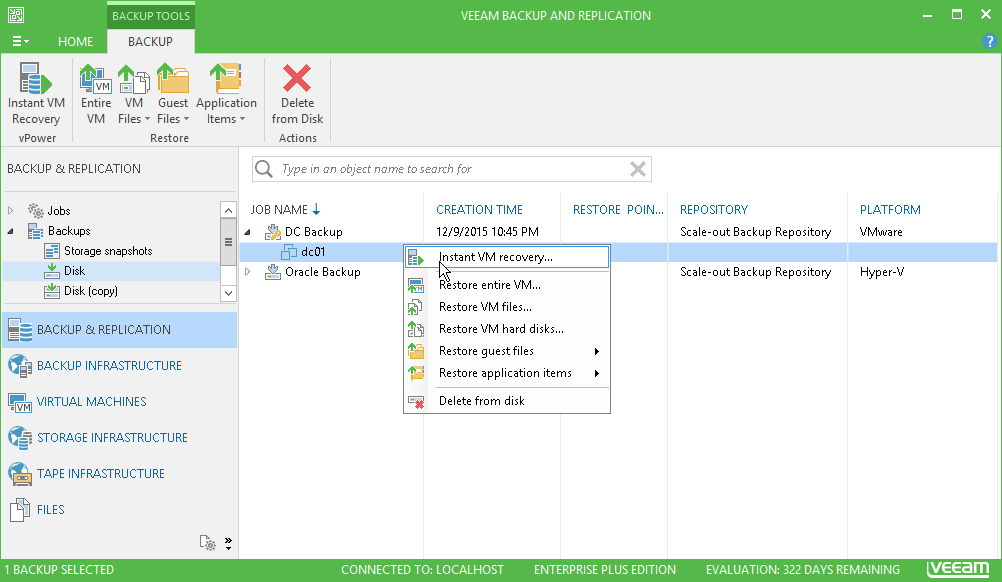
- Recovering VMware ESXi VM using Veeam Backup and Replication (Foundation)
- Developer: Veeam Software
- Release: February 26, 2008; 18 years ago
- Stable release: 12.3.2.3617 / June 17, 2025; 17 months ago
- Operating system: Windows Server 2012 or later & Windows 10 or later
- Platform: X86-64
- Available in: English
- Type: Backup software
- License: Trialware
- Website: www.veeam.com/vm-backup-recovery-replication-software.html

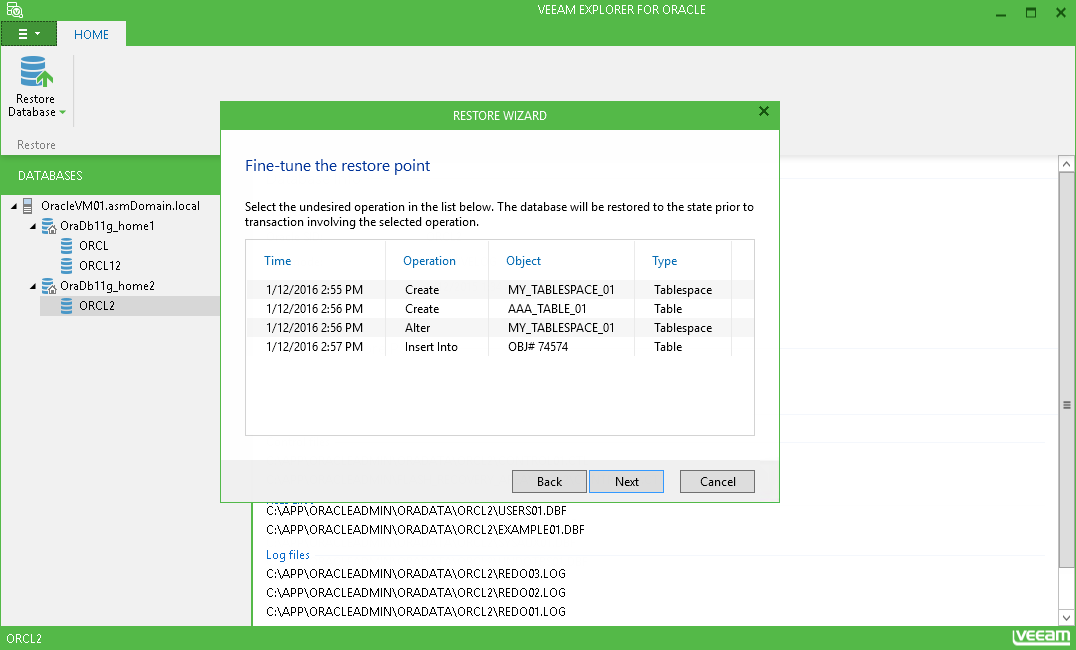
Recovering Oracle database using Veeam Explorer

Veeam Backup & Replication is a proprietary backup app developed by Veeam Software as one of their first widely adopted initial products, ultimately expanding beyong the Foundation pillar (VBR) of the Veeam Data Platform ^{[1]}. Initially designed with Physical and Virtual Environments (e.g. Hypervisors, HCI, KVM's, etc); Most notably as of 12.3 includes VMware vSphere, Nutanix AHV, KVM's and Microsoft Hyper-V among others. The software platform support has expanded and provides backup, optional malware detection scans during backup, restore, replication/CDP, and much more functionality for virtual machines, physical servers, workstations as well as cloud-based workloads and unstructured data.

== Operation ==
Veeam Backup & Replication operates both the virtualization layer as well manages physical machine backup. It backs up VMs at the image-level using a hypervisor's snapshots to retrieve VM data. Backups can be full (a full copy of VM image) or incremental (saving only the changed blocks of data since the last backup job run). Backup increments are created using the built-in changed block tracking (CBT) mechanism. The available backup methods include forward incremental-forever backup, forward incremental backup, and reverse incremental backup. Additionally, there is an option to perform active full and synthetic full backups.
Veeam Backup & Replication provides automated recovery verification for both backups and replicas. The program starts a VM directly from a backup or replica in the isolated test environment and runs tests against it. During the verification, the VM image remains in a read-only state. This mechanism can also be used for troubleshooting or testing patches and upgrades.

=== Backup storage ===
Veeam Backup & Replication supports software-defined storage technology. It allows organizing a scalable backup repository from a collection of heterogeneous storage devices. Backups can be stored on-premises, transferred to off-site repositories via the WAN, saved to tape media for long-term retention, or sent to cloud storage. Cloud storage support is available on an Infrastructure-as-a-Service (IaaS) model. Veeam's technology, Cloud Connect, provides integrated and secured backup to the cloud through Veeam-powered service providers.
Veeam Backup & Replication is storage-agnostic, but it also has specialized storage integrations with some storage systems such as Cisco HyperFlex, EMC VNX, EMC VNXe, HP 3PAR, HP StoreVirtual, Nimble, NetApp, IBM, Lenovo Storage V Series. In addition, through a separate Universal Storage API and plug-in, Veeam also provides storage integrations with Infinidat and Pure Storage. It uses storage system snapshots as a source for backups and recovery of VMware VMs with disks residing on storage volumes. Veeam Backup & Replication also have build in direct NFS agent which allows to access NetApp snapshots directly from NAS storage bypassing hosts for backup, restore & storage scan operations.

=== Replication ===
Along with backup, Veeam Backup & Replication can perform image-based VM replication. It creates a "clone" of a production VM onsite or offsite and keeps it in a ready-to-use state. Each VM replica has a configurable number of failover points. Image-based VM replication is also available via Veeam Cloud Connect for Disaster Recovery as a Service (DRaaS).

=== Recovery ===
The software provides a number of data recovery options, including:
Entire VM recovery:

- An immediate restore of a VM via mounting a VM image to a host directly from a backup file (Instant VM Recovery)
- Full extraction of a VM image from a backup

File-level recovery:

- Restore specific VM files such as virtual disks, configuration files, etc.
- VM guest OS files restore from a number of different file systems including Linux, BSD macOS, Novell NetWare and Solaris

Virtual drive restore:

- A specific VM hard drive recovery

Application-item recovery:

- Granular recovery of items from Microsoft Exchange Server, Microsoft SharePoint, Microsoft Active Directory, Microsoft SQL Server and Oracle Databases, as well as recovery of single files and VMs from storage snapshots for existing storage partners.

=== Optimization ===
Veeam Backup & Replication decreases backup files size and data traffic with built-in data deduplication and compression. There is support for deduplicating storage systems such as EMC Data Domain, ExaGrid and HP StoreOnce Catalyst and NetApp Cloud Backup (AltaVault). Using deduplicating storage appliances as backup repositories allows achieving greater levels of deduplication ratios. Veeam Backup & Replication also provides built-in WAN acceleration to reduce the bandwidth required for transferring backups and replicas over the WAN.

== Architecture ==
Built on a modular scheme, Veeam Backup & Replication allows for setting scalable backup infrastructures. The software architecture supports onsite, offsite and cloud-base data protection, operations across remote sites and geographically dispersed locations. The installation package of Veeam Backup & Replication includes a set of mandatory and optional components that can be installed on physical or virtual machines.

=== Mandatory components ===
- Veeam backup server – a Windows-based physical or virtual machine where Veeam Backup & Replication is installed. It is the core component responsible for all types of administrative activities in a backup infrastructure, including general orchestration of backup, restore and replication tasks, job scheduling and resource allocation.
- Backup proxy – an appliance that retrieves backup data from the source host and transfers it to the backup repository offloading the Veeam backup server.
- Backup repository – a primary storage for backup files, VM copies, and meta-data.

=== Optional components ===
- Backup Enterprise Manager – a centralized management web browser interface intended for distributed enterprise environments with multiple backup servers.
- Veeam Backup Search – an add-on to Microsoft Search Server for search performance optimization.
- Standalone Console — a lightweight console for installation on laptops and desktops to enable the management of the backup server remotely over the network and eliminate RDP sessions to a backup server.
- Scale-Out Backup Repository — Since version 9 it's possible to build a flat backup repository space from a number of independent and non-clustered sources. This feature eliminates any need in a clustered backup namespace, now Veeam users to store older backups in more affordable storage targets.

== Editions ==
Veeam Backup & Replication is positioned as a part of the Veeam Availability Suite bundle (which includes Veeam ONE for monitoring, reporting, and capacity planning), but can also be installed as a standalone product. It is available in three editions based on the level of provided functionality. The product is licensed by the number of CPU sockets, or through annually or upfront-billed subscription licenses on a per-VM basis. As of Veeam Backup & Replication 9.5 Update 4 (U4), Veeam is now using Veeam Instance Licensing (VIL) to lower complexity of license key management. Essentially, VIL allows for a single license key, or instance, to be deployed on most Veeam products - from Backup & Replication server to Veeam ONE to Windows and Linux agents. The number of instance keys consumed per machine will vary by license edition (standard, enterprise, or enterprise plus) and the software you are enabling.

== History ==
| Version | Year | Major changes and improvements |
|---|---|---|
| 1.0 | 2008 | The first version released under the name of Veeam Backup provided backup, replication, file copying, file-level recovery and deduplication for VMware ESX Server environments. |
| 2.0 | 2008 | Added VSS support, VMware ESXi support, and enhanced VCB (VMware Consolidated Backup) performance. |
| 3.0 | 2009 | Added the support for ESXi free edition, Linux file-level recovery, VSS support for Windows 2008 guests and VM templates backup. |
| 4.0 | 2009 | The product was renamed to Veeam Backup & Replication. Added support for vStorage APIs, Changed Block Tracking (CBT), thin-provisioned disks and enhanced replication functionality. |
| 5.0 | 2010 | Introduced a patented vPower technology enabling an automated recovery verification for backups and sandbox VMs for testing purposes. Added a number of recovery features, including an ability to restore a VM directly from a backup file (Instant VM Recovery), application-item and file-level restore options. |
| 6.0 | 2011 | Added the support for Microsoft Hyper-V and a number of replication and recovery enhancements. |
| 6.5 | 2012 | Added Veeam Explorer tools for a granular recovery from Microsoft Exchange VM backups and storage snapshots. |
| 7.0 | 2013 | Added WAN-acceleration, tape support, integration with HP storage systems, virtual lab technology for Hyper-V and replicas, and Veeam Explorer tool for Microsoft SharePoint granular recovery. |
| 8.0 | 2014 | Added Veeam Explorer tools for a granular recovery from Microsoft Active Directory and Microsoft SQL Server, integration with NetApp storage systems and EMC Data Domain Boost, cloud storages support, and AES 256-bit data encryption. |
| 9.0 | 2016 | Added support for EMC VNX and VNXe hybrid storage arrays, Veeam Explorer tool for Oracle recovery and the support for software-defined storage. Introduced VM replication to the cloud. |
| 9.5 | 2016 | Added Nimble Storage Snapshot integration, direct restore to Microsoft Azure, support for Resilient File System. |
| 9.5 U3 | 2017 | Added Built-in Agent Management, Data Location Tagging, additional platform support and introduced the Universal Storage API including storage snapshot integrations with IBM Spectrum Virtualize and Lenovo Storage V Series |
| 9.5 U3a | 2018 | Added platform support for VMware vSphere 6.7, VMware vCloud Director 9.1, Microsoft Windows Server 1803, and Microsoft Windows April 10, 2018 Update |
| 9.5 U4 | 2019 | Added support for Amazon S3 object storage as a destination for offloaded backups in a Scale-Out Backup Repository. It works with any S3 protocol compatible object storage arrays. |
| 10.0 | 2020 | Added support for Network-attached storage backups and immutable backups with S3 object lock functionality. |
| 10a | 2020 | Courtesy update to resolve CVEs for those who wished to remain on V10 |
| 11.0 | 2021 | Added support for Google Cloud Storage and Veeam Agent for Mac. |
| 11a | 2021 | General platform support updates |
| 12.0 | 2023 | |
| 12.1 | 2023 | |
