= Altoros =

Altoros Systems, Inc.
- Type: Privately held companies
- Industry: Software Product Development; Big Data, IT Consulting
- Founded: 2001
- Headquarters: Pleasanton, California, United States
- Key people: Renat Khasanshyn (CEO), Andrei Yurkevich (President)
- Number of employees: over 250 (Q2, 2015)
- Website: www.altoros.com www.altoroslabs.com

Altoros Systems (also spelled as "Альторос") is a software development company that provides products and services for the Cloud Foundry platform. Altoros contributes to development and evolution of this open source initiative as governed by the Linux Foundation.

Headquartered in Silicon Valley, the company runs offices in U.S., Norway, Denmark, UK, Finland, Sweden, Argentina and Belarus. Altoros actively supports and brings up technology communities in America and Europe by organizing related educational events (such as meetups, CloudCamps, user group meetings, hackathons, free programming courses, etc.)

== History ==
Altoros was founded in 2001 as an outsourcing software development vendor. It then built platform-as-a-service and DevOps technology and provided consultancy around big data and cloud computing.

In 2007, Altoros founded Belarus Java User Group, which unites more than 500 Java developers in Belarus. Since 2008, Altoros has been arranging a variety of conferences and other events for IT specialists in Belarus, featuring Microsoft, Adobe, SUN Microsystems, and Engine Yard representatives as speakers.

In February 2007, Altoros launched Apatar, a Java-based data integration (ETL) project. The open source version of the product was released under the GPL 2.0 license.

In July 2008, Altoros became a resident of Belarus High Technologies Park, a business environment for IT companies in Eastern Europe that forces cooperation in IT on the inter-governmental level.

In 2010, Altoros co-founded Belarus Ruby on Rails User Group. To support this initiative, in August 2011, the company launched free educational Ruby on Rails training course for developers in Eastern Europe. Altoros also sponsors numerous Ruby conferences around the world (RubyConf in Argentina, Barcelona Ruby Conference in Spain, RubyConfBY in Belarus, etc.).

On October 11, 2011, Altoros officially organized the first CloudCamp in Denmark (in its standard format/agenda). It was followed by the first CloudCamp in Eastern Europe—held on April 7, 2012 (in Minsk, Belarus).

In addition, Altoros's engineers regularly speak at IT events across both Europe and America, sharing their experience in big data, cloud computing, PaaS, etc., Local IT news resource writes about a 3-day conference held by Adobe and arranged by Altoros. Altoros is also a partner of Belarus .NET User Group, Belarus Adobe Flash Platform User Group, Belarus Microsoft Certified Professional Club, and Belarus Open Source Lab―among others.

In February 2014, Altoros was recognized as one of top big data, business intelligence and Hadoop consultants (by Clutch, ex-SourcingLine, an independent Washington, DC–based research company).

On 23 June 2020, Altoros confirmed the introduction of Temperature Screener, a monitoring system to help deter COVID-19 from spreading. The Temperature Screener, powered by artificial intelligence (AI), detects people with elevated body temperature—a significant symptom of the SARS-CoV-2 virus.

=== Open source projects ===
Altoros is the founder of Apatar, an open source data integration project used by 27,000+ companies worldwide. The project connects data between different sources (mainly, databases and CRM/ERP systems).

Altoros is an active contributor to other open-source initiatives, such as Couchbase Server (a distributed NoSQL document-oriented database) and Cloud Foundry (a platform-as-a-service system).

Starting from 2012, Altoros regularly issues independent technology benchmarks that help to evaluate performance of open source big data technologies, such as Hadoop and NoSQL systems (MongoDB, Couchbase, Cassandra, Redis, etc.).

=== Cloud Foundry contributions ===
One of the company’s first major code contribution to Cloud Foundry was development of the CF Vagrant Installer (built in 2013). At that time, this was one of the main tools for deploying Cloud Foundry on small instances, such as a laptop.

Altoros is also contributing to development of Juju Charms for Cloud Foundry—an orchestration tool for deploying CF on Ubuntu infrastructures. This collaborative project is led by Pivotal and Canonical.
