= City Transformer =

Israeli electric vehicle automaker

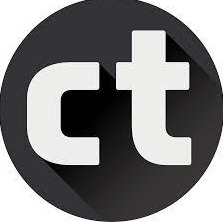
- Industry: Electric automotive
- Founded: 2014; 12 years ago
- Headquarters: Tel Aviv, Israel
- Key people: Dr. Asaf Formoza (CEO and founder) and Udi Meridor (COO and founder)
- Products: Ct-1 ct-2
- Website: https://www.citytransformer.com/

City Transformer is an Israeli electric vehicle company founded in 2014 by Asaf Formoza and Udi Meridor.

City Transformer has 2 models: CT-1 – ready for production, and CT-2 – future model.

== History ==
In 2013 Formoza, Gidi Goldwine, and Erez Abramov developed a foldable car chassis design. This mechanism enabled them to create a two-seater urban electric micro vehicle that could change its width while driving, transforming from a width of 1.4 meters to a width of 1 meter. The wide mode is designated for open roads where the vehicle can reach a speed of 90 km/h and the narrow mode is designated for urban heavy traffic and for parking in narrow spaces. The founders then created a two-seater electric vehicle that changed its width while driving.

In 2014, the company was founded and automobile designer Eyal Kremer joined the company along with Johanne Tomforde. In late 2017, the car concept was revealed at the Smart mobility Summit in Tel Aviv. The design has received various awards, including a gold medal in passenger vehicle design at the German Design Council in 2023.

The company received a grant of NIS 3.15 million ($900,000) from the Innovations authority of Israel, in conjunction with the Israel Prime Minister's Office's national program for fuel alternatives and smart mobility. The company's concept was revealed in 2017.

In 2020, the company was featured in Time’s "100 inventions for 2020".

In 2021, the company signed a deal to provide United Hatzalah emergency responders with vehicles that have the ability to contract to 1 meter for easy maneuvering in times of emergency. In 2022, the company entered a partnership with Bosch Software.

The company raised $20 million since inception, from private and corporate investors, including: Afifi Group, Lubinski Group, Matam Motors, Eitan Ben-Eliyahu, Barak Rosen and Eyal Chomsky.

== City Transformers models ==
=== CT-1 and CT-2 ===
CT-1 is a two-seater foldable electric vehicle with dimensions of 250L/153H/140W cm while unfolded and 250L/143H/100W cm when folded. The model was introduced in August 2021. CT-1 is powered by two electric motors of 7.5 kW and weighs 450 kg without a battery and 590 kg with a battery.

In 2021, CT-1 made a debut at the Munich IAA mobility. In 2022, the CT-1 model participated in the 2022 Paris Motor Show.

The CT-2 model will be launched at the end of 2024. CT-2 model will have features such as a range of 180 km, a sunroof, smartphone connectivity, electric windows, AC, and heating.

== Gallery ==
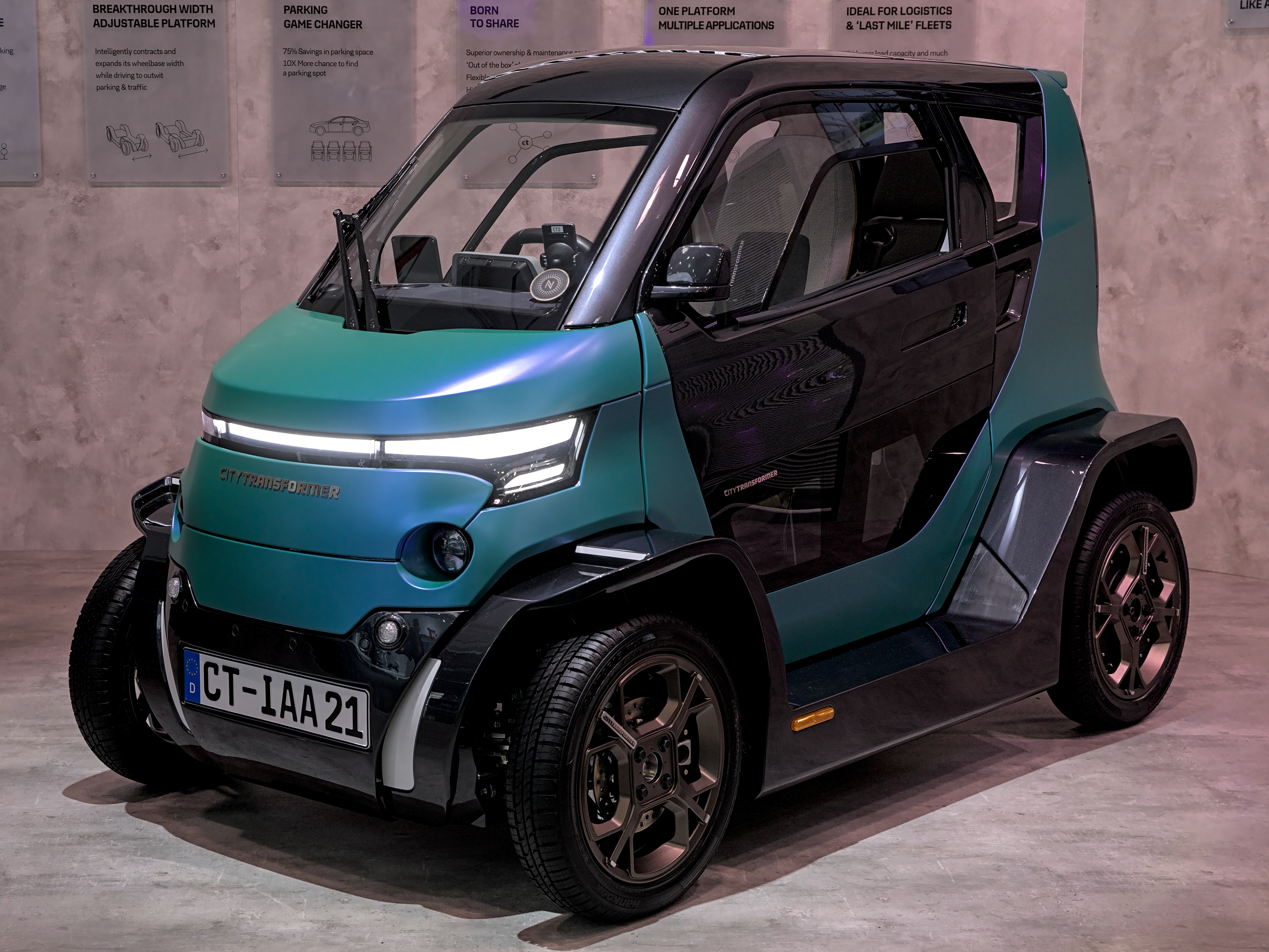
CT-1 wide modde

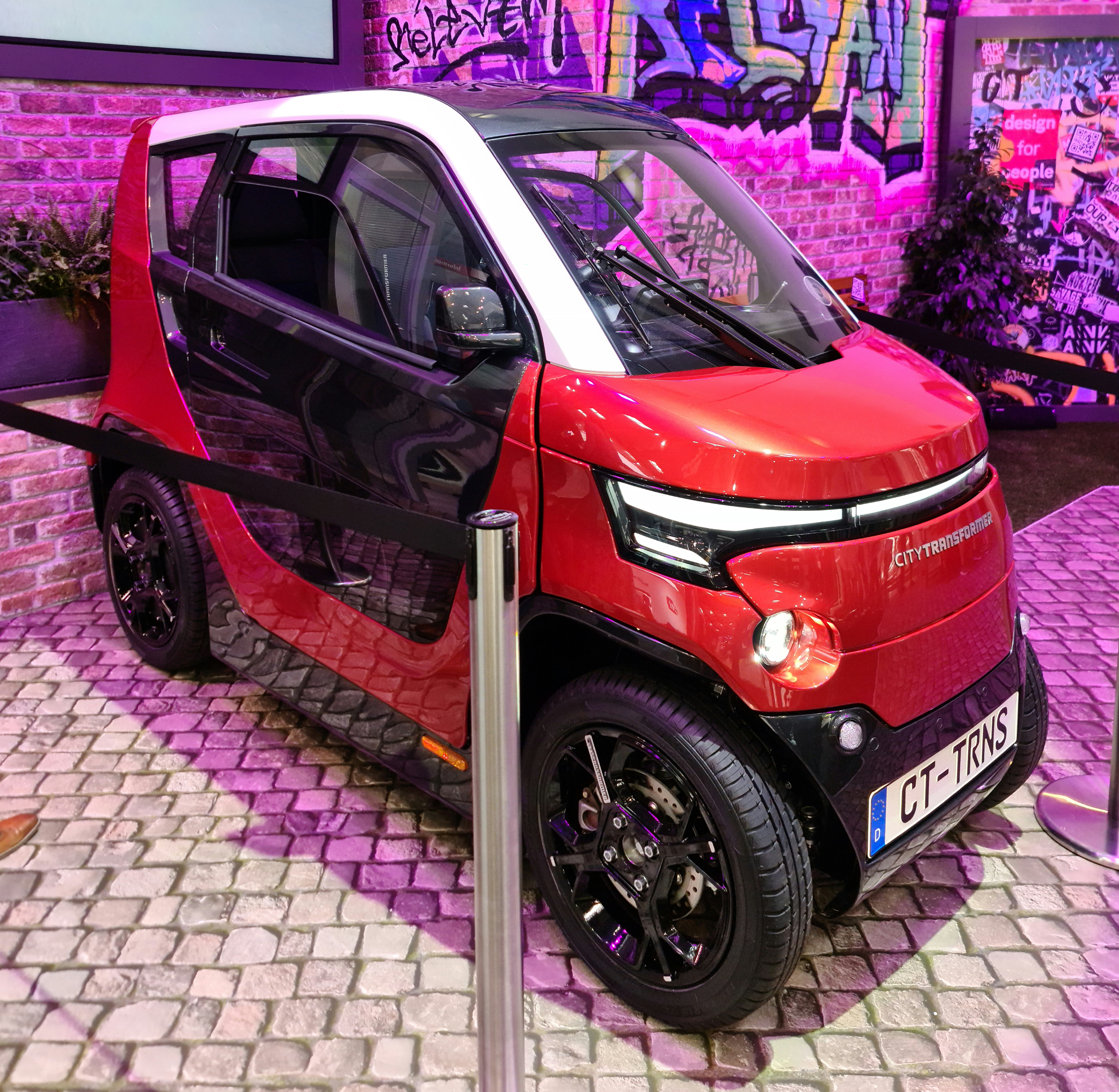
CT-1 at the Munich IAA debut

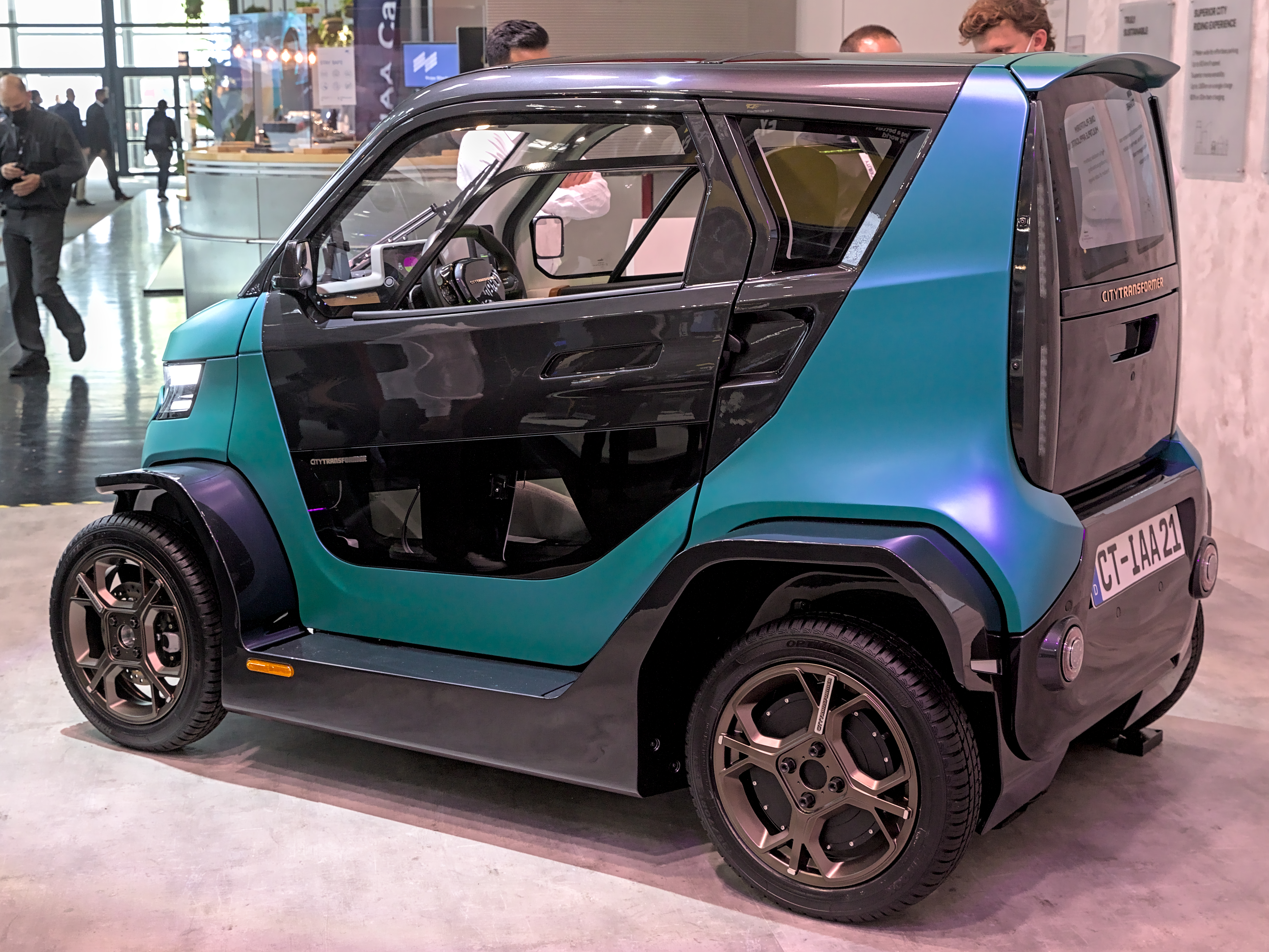
Rear side of CT-1

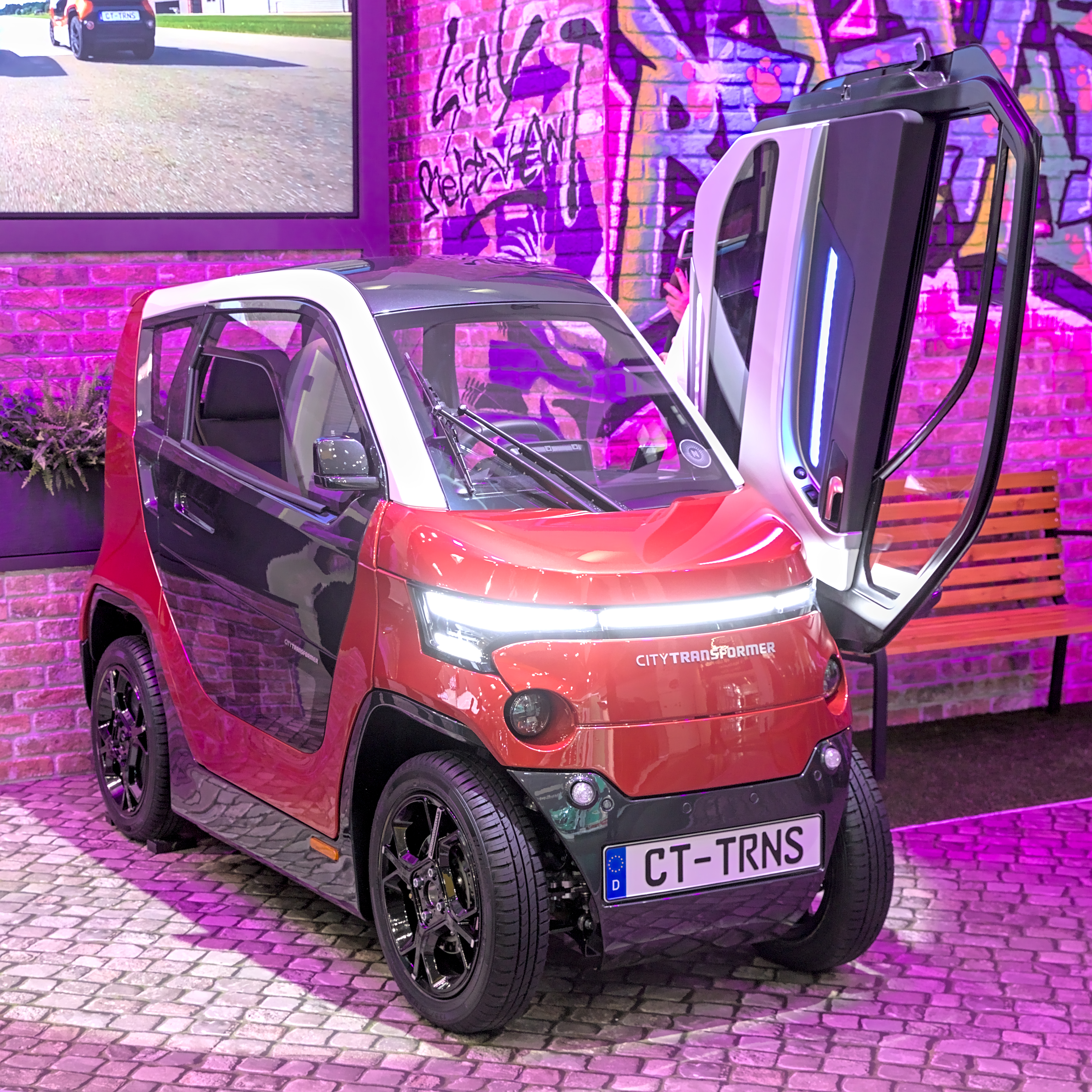
Front side of CT-1
