= Ignacio M. Llorente =

Spanish entrepreneur and educator (born 1969)

Ignacio Martín Llorente (born July 1, 1969) is a Spanish entrepreneur, researcher, and educator specializing in cloud and distributed computing. He is the director of OpenNebula, a visiting scholar at Harvard University, and a full professor at the UCM (UCM). Llorente is an IEEE (Institute of Electrical and Electronics Engineers) Senior Member. He holds a Ph.D. in computer science from the UCM and an Executive MBA from IE Business School in Madrid.

== Education and academic career ==
Llorente graduated with a degree in physics, majoring in computer science, in 1992. He earned his Ph.D. in physics, with a specialty in computer science, from the Complutense University of Madrid in 1995. In 2003, he received an Executive MBA from IE Business School. Following his Ph.D. research on efficient execution of scientific applications on parallel computers, he worked on parallel systems with various scaling models.

Llorente was promoted to associate professor at the Complutense University of Madrid in 1997. From 1997 to 2002, he held consultancy positions at the Institute for Computer Applications in Science and Engineering at the NASA Langley Research Center, where he conducted research on multi-grid methods, their application to computational fluid dynamics, and their parallel implementation.

Since 2002, Llorente has led the Distributed Systems Architecture Research Group, focusing on large-scale distributed infrastructures, virtualization technologies, distributed computing, and resource provision platforms. He supported projects including the EU-funded RESERVOIR project. His research has focused on architectures, meta-scheduling, and benchmarking for grid computing, as well as cloud computing architectures and federation. This work has contributed to several open-source technologies, including Globus, GridWay, and OpenNebula. In 2010, he co-founded C12G Labs, a cloud computing technology startup that leads OpenNebula development.

Llorente became a full professor in 2006. From 2002 to 2007, he also served as a senior researcher in the Advanced Computing Lab at CAB (a CSIC/INTA center associated with the NASA Astrobiology Institute). In 2009, he co-founded and co-chaired the Open Grid Forum Working Group on the Open Cloud Computing Interface. Since 2009, he has participated in the European Cloud Computing Group of Experts.

== Awards ==
Llorente received the ARITMEL Award for Computer Science in 2020 for his contributions to cloud computing.
