= OCCI =

OCCI may refer to:

- Online Civil Courage Initiative, a partnership between the Institute for Strategic Dialogue and Facebook
- Ontario Case Costing Initiative, see Canadian Institute for Health Information
- Ontario Consortium for Cardiac Imaging, a project of Sunnybrook Research Institute
- Open Cloud Computing Interface, an open protocol for cloud computing
- Oracle C++ Call Interface, a proprietary database API
- Osaka Chamber of Commerce and Industry; see Inabata Katsutaro
