= ExaGrid =

Hardware company

ExaGrid Systems, Inc.
- Type: Private; portfolio company of Lead Edge Capital
- Industry: Data storage, Backup appliances
- Founded: 2002
- Founder: Dave Therrien
- Headquarters: Marlborough, Massachusetts, U.S.
- Area served: Worldwide (over 80 countries)
- Key people: Bill Andrews (President & CEO); Dave Therrien (CTO & Founder)
- Products: Tiered backup storage appliances with disk-cache "landing zone" and scale-out architecture
- Services: Data deduplication, backup acceleration, ransomware recovery
- Number of employees: ≈ 400 + (2024 est.)
- Website: www.exagrid.com

ExaGrid Systems, Inc. is a private American data storage company headquartered in Marlborough, Massachusetts. Founded in 2002, it develops tiered backup storage appliances that use a disk-cache landing zone and scale-out architecture to improve backup speed, recovery time, and ransomware resilience. The company operates globally in more than 80 countries.

== ExaGrid History ==
The company was founded in 2002 by Dave Therrien to solve the challenge of integrated primary storage with data backup. The company was funded by venture backed funding from Sigma Partners and Highland Capital Partners.

The name ExaGrid was derived from two words: “Exa” from exabytes of data and, “Grid,” an approach to grid computing scale-out storage which ExaGrid was based on.

In 2005, Bill Andrews joined the company as president and CEO. Bill currently remains in the position as of 2022. Under Bill's leadership the company pivoted to backup storage with a tiered backup storage architecture.

In 2006, ExaGrid shipped its first backup storage appliances.

Over the years from 2006 to current, ExaGrid has added many features/functions such as zone level deduplication, adaptive deduplication, global deduplication, scale to 2.7PB full backups, 32 appliances in a single scale-out system, the ability to deduplicate Commvault data, the ability to support Veritas NetBackup Accelerator, support of the Veeam Data Mover and Veeam SOBR (scale-out backup repository) and many other features and functions.

ExaGrid appliances are used by companies to store their backup data. The appliances are used in IT data centers in commercial accounts, public education, local government, federal government and universities.

In 2007 ExaGrid raised capital from Lehman Brothers (now Tenaya Capital)

From 2007 to current, ExaGrid has opened offices in over 20 countries including: Argentina/Chile, Australia, Benelux, Brazil, Canada, Colombia, Czech Republic, France, Germany, Hong Kong, Iberia, Israel, Malaysia, Mexico, Nordics, Poland, Russia, Saudi, Singapore, South Africa, Turkey, United Kingdom, United States.

In 2009 ExaGrid raised capital from Investor Growth Capital (Investor AB).

In 2009, ExaGrid's largest competitor, Data Domain was acquired by EMC, a leader storage and later EMC was acquired by Dell. Today ExaGrid's largest competitor is Dell.

In 2014, industry analyst firm Gartner placed ExaGrid in the visionary quadrant in their Magic Quadrant for deduplication backup target appliances.

In 2016, the Metasploit project for performing security pentation added a module to gain root level access to ExaGrid appliances.

In 2017, ExaGrid expanded its customer base to include MSP (Managed Service Providers) and IT OutSourcers.

In January 2019, ExaGrid moved its corporate headquarters from Westborough, MA, to The Campus at Marlborough in Marlborough, MA.

In June 2019, a Common Vulnerabilities and Exposures bulletin CVE-2019-12310 is released indicating a critical (9.8 out of 10 score on the CVSS v3.0 scale) security issue with ExaGrid firmware version 4.8.1.1044.P50 allowing remote attackers to view verbose log information without having to provide a password.

In 2020, the company won 7 industry awards: Network Computing Awards (Company of the Year and Hardware Product of the Year), Storage Awards “The Stories XVII” (Enterprise Backup Hardware Vendor of the Year and Storage Performance Optimization Company of the Year), SDC Awards (Storage Company of the Year, Storage Hardware Innovation of the Year and Vendor Channel Program of the Year).

In April 2021, according to industry press the company reportedly paid 2.6 million dollars to Conti ransomware attackers. Attackers claimed to get "personal data of clients and employees, commercial contracts, NDA forms, financial data, tax returns and source code."

In 2021, the company won 9 industry awards: Network Computing Awards (Bench Tested Product of the Year, Storage Product of the Year and The Return on Investment award), Storage Awards “The Storries XVIII” (Enterprise Backup Hardware Vendor of the Year and Immutable Storage Company of the Year), SDC Awards (Vendor Channel Program of the Year, Storage Hardware Innovation of the Year and Storage Company of the Year).

On January 1, 2022, growth capital firm Lead Edge Capital invested in ExaGrid and is part of the company's board of directors.
