= VMware Infrastructure =

Collection of virtualization products

- Developer: VMware, Inc.
- Stable release: 3.5 Update 4 / March 30, 2009; 17 years ago
- Platform: x86-compatible
- Type: Hypervisor
- License: Proprietary
- Website: vmware.com/products/vi/

VMware Infrastructure is a collection of virtualization products from VMware. Virtualization is an abstraction layer that decouples hardware from operating systems. The VMware Infrastructure suite allows enterprises to optimize and manage their IT infrastructure through virtualization as an integrated offering. The core product families are vSphere, vSAN and NSX for on-premises virtualization. VMware Cloud Foundation (VCF) is an infrastructure platform for hybrid cloud management. The VMware Infrastructure suite is designed to span a large range of deployment types to provide maximum flexibility and scalability.

== Components ==
The suite included:

- VMware ESX Server version 3
- VMware ESXi version 3.x
- VMware vCenter version 2 (formally VMware VirtualCenter)
- Virtual SMP (which allows a guest operating system to "see" up to four CPUs in the virtual machine).

Users can supplement this software bundle by purchasing optional products, such as VMotion, as well as distributed services such as high availability (HA), distributed resource scheduler (DRS), or consolidated backup.

VMware Inc. released VMware Infrastructure 3 in June 2006. The suite came in three "editions": Starter, Standard and Enterprise.

== Limitations ==
Known limitations in VMware Infrastructure 3 may constrain the design of data centers:

As of June 2008 limitations in VMware Infrastructure version 3.5 included the following:

- Guest system maximum RAM: 64 mb
- Number of guest CPUs: 4
- Number of hosts in an HA cluster: 32
- Number of hosts in a DRS cluster: 32
- Size of RAM per server: 256 GB
- Number of hosts managed by Virtual Center Server: 200
- Number of virtual machines managed by Virtual Center Server: 2000

No limitations were, for example, volume size of 64 TB with no more than 6 SCSI controllers per virtual machine; maximum number of remote consoles to a virtual machine is 10.

It is also not possible to connect Fibre Channel tape drives, which hinders the ability to do backups using these drives.

== Renaming ==
VMware renamed their product VMware vSphere for release 4, and marketed it for cloud computing.

== See also ==
- Comparison of platform virtualization software
- Virtual appliance
- VMware VMFS, the VMware SAN file system
- x86 virtualization
