= Apatar =

- Stable release: v1.12.13 / October 25, 2010
- Operating system: Cross-platform
- Type: ETL, Data migration and SQL.
- License: General Public License version 2.0
- Website: apatar.com

Apatar is an open source ETL (Extract-Transform-Load) and data integration software application.

== History ==
Apatar open source project was founded in 2005. The first version of the tool was released under the GPLv2 license at www.sourceforge.net in February 2007. In April 2007, Apatar alpha version was demonstrated to its strategic partners, including MySQL and BlackDuck. Apatar, Inc., a commercial company that provides support for the Apatar open source software, was founded in 2007 as a branch of Altoros.

== Products ==
The company’s main product is Apatar, a cross-platform open source desktop data integration tool that provides connectivity to a variety of databases, applications, protocols, files, and many more.

== Users and customers ==
Apatar’s user and customer base ranges from small companies and individuals to large organizations such as the World Bank Group, Thomson Reuters, John Wiley & Sons, R.R. Donnelley, Autodesk. and more.
