= Aelita Software =

American software company

Aelita Software Corporation
- Industry: Software
- Founded: 1998; 28 years ago
- Founder: Ratmir Timashev
- Fate: Acquired by Quest Software
- Headquarters: Aliso Viejo, California
- Key people: Ratmir Timashev; William H. (Bill) Largent; Andrei Baronov
- Products: Migration Manager for AD; Migration Manager Exchange; Secure Copy; Enterprise Reporter; Recovery Manager Active Directory; Active Roles Server; InTrust
- Owner: Quest Software
- Website: www.quest.com

Aelita Software Corporation is a software company that provided enterprise network management tools for improved security, usability, and control. Aelita software has developed solutions for Microsoft Windows 2000 and 2003 migration and domain reconfiguration, security analysis, directory management, systems monitoring, and configuration recovery. Examples of Aelita Software products include Aelita Domain Migration Wizard, Aelita Exchange Migration Wizard, Aelita InTrust, Aelita Archive Manager, and others.

The company was acquired by Quest Software in March 2004 for about $115 million. Aelita Software products and technology have been incorporated into Quest's Windows Management products. Much of the management from Aelita transitioned to Veeam, which launched in 2006. In 2012, Quest Software was acquired by Dell, for $2.36 billion to form the Dell Software. In June 2016, Dell announced the sale of their software division, including the Quest business, to Francisco Partners and Elliott Management Corporation.

On November 1, 2016, the sale of Dell Software to Francisco Partners and Elliott Management was completed and the company was re-launched as Quest Software.
