= Comparison of CDMI server implementations =

Implementation	SNIA Reference Implementation	CDMI-Serve	CDMI-Proxy	CDMI for OpenStack's Swift	onedata
Version	1.0e	238c28fc7c	0.1	f0e3ad9bac	2.0
CDMI Version	1.0.2	?	1.0.1	?	1.0.2
HTTP features
HTTPS	?	?	Yes	?	Yes
Basic authentication	?	?	Yes	?	?
Digest authentication	?	?	Yes	?	?
X.509 authentication	?	?	?	?	Yes
X.509-VOMS authentication	?	?	?	?	Yes
Token based authentication	?	?	?	?	Yes
Data access methods
FUSE	?	?	?	?	Yes
GridFTP	?	?	?	?	No
iSCSI	Yes	?	?	?	No
WebDAV	?	?	?	?	No
NFS	?	?	?	?	No
BUI	?	?	?	?	Yes
System-Wide CDMI Capabilities
cdmi_domains	"false"	"false"	"false"	"false"	"false
cdmi_export_cifs	"false"	"false"	"false"	"false"	"false"
cdmi_dataobjects	"true"	"true"	"true"	"true"	"true"
cdmi_export_iscsi	"false"	"false"	"false"	"false"	"false"
cdmi_export_nfs	"false"	"false"	"false"	"false"	"false"
cdmi_export_occi_iscsi	"true"	"false"	"false"	"false"	"false"
cdmi_export_webdav	"false"	"false"	"false"	"false"	"false"
cdmi_metadata_maxitems	1024	?	?	?	1024
cdmi_metadata_maxsize	4096	?	?	?	4096
cdmi_metadata_maxtotalsize	∞	?	?	?	1048576
cdmi_notification	"false"	"false"	"false"	"false"	"false"
cdmi_logging	"false"	"false"	"false"	"false"	"false"
cdmi_query	"false"	"false"	"false"	"false"	"false"
cdmi_query_regex	"false"	"false"	"false"	"false"	"false"
cdmi_query_contains	"false"	"false"	"false"	"false"	"false"
cdmi_query_tags	"false"	"false"	"false"	"false"	"false"
cdmi_query_value	"false"	"false"	"false"	"false"	"false"
cdmi_queues	"false"	"false"	"false"	"false"	"false"
cdmi_security_access_control	"false"	"false"	"false"	"false"	"true"
cdmi_security_audit	"false"	"false"	"false"	"false"	"false"
cdmi_security_data_integrity	"false"	"false"	"false"	"false"	"false"
cdmi_security_encryption	"false"	"false"	"false"	"false"	"false"
cdmi_security_immutability	"false"	"false"	"false"	"false"	"false"
cdmi_security_sanitization	"false"	"false"	"false"	"false"	"false"
cdmi_serialization_json	"false"	"false"	"false"	"false"	"false"
cdmi_snapshots	"false"	"false"	"false"	"false"	"false"
cdmi_references	"false"	"false"	"false"	"false"	"false"
cdmi_object_move_from_local	"false"	"false"	"false"	"false"	"true"
cdmi_object_move_from_remote	"false"	"false"	"false"	"false"	"false"
cdmi_object_move_from_ID	"false"	"false"	"false"	"false"	"false"
cdmi_object_move_to_ID	"false"	"false"	"false"	"false"	"false"
cdmi_object_copy_from_local	"false"	"false"	"false"	"false"	"true"
cdmi_object_copy_from_remote	"false"	"false"	"false"	"false"	"false"
cdmi_object_access_by_ID	"false"	"false"	"false"	"false"	"true"
cdmi_post_dataobject_by_ID	"false"	"false"	"false"	"false"	"false"
cdmi_post_queue_by_ID	"false"	"false"	"false"	"false"	"false"
cdmi_deserialize_dataobject_by_ID	"false"	"false"	"false"	"false"	"false"
cdmi_deserialize_queue_by_ID	"false"	"false"	"false"	"false"	"false"
cdmi_serialize_dataobject_to_ID	"false"	"false"	"false"	"false"	"false"
cdmi_serialize_domain_to_ID	"false"	"false"	"false"	"false"	"false"
cdmi_serialize_container_to_ID	"false"	"false"	"false"	"false"	"false"
cdmi_serialize_queue_to_ID	"false"	"false"	"false"	"false"	"false"
cdmi_copy_dataobject_by_ID	"false"	"false"	"false"	"false"	"false"
cdmi_copy_queue_by_ID	"false"	"false"	"false"	"false"	"false"
cdmi_create_reference_by_ID	"false"	"false"	"false"	"false"	"false"
Data Object Capabilities
cdmi_read_value	"false"	"false"	"true"	"false"	"true"
cdmi_read_value_range	"false"	"false"	"false"	"false"	"true"
cdmi_read_metadata	"false"	"false"	"true"	"false"	"true"
cdmi_modify_value	"false"	"false"	"true"	"false"	"true"
cdmi_modify_value_range	"false"	"false"	"false"	"false"	"true"
cdmi_modify_metadata	"false"	"false"	"true"	"false"	"true"
cdmi_modify_deserialize_dataobject	"false"	"false"	"false"	"false"	"false"
cdmi_delete_dataobject	"true"	"true"	"true"	"true"	"true"
cdmi_acl	"false"	"false"	"false"	"false"	"true"
cdmi_size	"false"	"false"	"false"	"false"	"true"
cdmi_ctime	"false"	"false"	"false"	"false"	"true"
cdmi_atime	"false"	"false"	"false"	"false"	"true"
cdmi_mtime	"false"	"false"	"false"	"false"	"true"
cdmi_acount	"false"	"false"	"false"	"false"	"false"
cdmi_mcount	"false"	"false"	"false"	"false"	"false"
cdmi_assignedsize	"false"	"false"	"false"	"false"	"false"
cdmi_data_redundancy	""	""	""	""	"false"
cdmi_data_dispersion	"false"	"false"	"false"	"false"	"false"
cdmi_data_retention	"false"	"false"	"false"	"false"	"false"
cdmi_data_autodelete	"false"	"false"	"false"	"false"	"false"
cdmi_data_holds	"false"	"false"	"false"	"false"	"false"
cdmi_encryption	[]	[]	[]	[]	"false"
cdmi_geographic_placement	"false"	"false"	"false"	"false"	"false"
cdmi_immediate_redundancy	""	""	""	""	"false"
cdmi_infrastructure_redundancy	""	""	""	""	"false"
cdmi_latency	"false"	"false"	"false"	"false"	"false"
cdmi_RPO	"false"	"false"	"false"	"false"	"false"
cdmi_RTO	"false"	"false"	"false"	"false"	"false"
cdmi_sanitization_method	[]	[]	[]	[]	"false"
cdmi_throughput	"false"	"false"	"false"	"false"	"false"
cdmi_value_hash	[]	[]	[]	[]	"false"
Container Capabilities
cdmi_list_children	"true"	"true"	"true"	"true"	"true"
cdmi_list_children_range	"false"	"false"	"false"	"false"	"true"
cdmi_read_metadata	"false"	"false"	"true"	"false"	"true"
cdmi_modify_metadata	"false"	"false"	"true"	"false"	"true"
cdmi_modify_deserialize_container	"false"	"false"	"false"	"false"	"false"
cdmi_snapshot	"false"	"false"	"false"	"false"	"false"
cdmi_serialize_dataobject	"false"	"false"	"false"	"false"	"false"
cdmi_serialize_container	"false"	"false"	"false"	"false"	"false"
cdmi_serialize_queue	"false"	"false"	"false"	"false"	"false"
cdmi_serialize_domain	"false"	"false"	"false"	"false"	"false"
cdmi_deserialize_container	"false"	"false"	"false"	"false"	"false"
cdmi_deserialize_queue	"false"	"false"	"false"	"false"	"false"
cdmi_deserialize_dataobject	"false"	"false"	"false"	"false"	"false"
cdmi_create_dataobject	"true"	"true"	"true"	"true"	"true"
cdmi_post_dataobject	"false"	"false"	"false"	"false"	"false"
cdmi_post_queue	"false"	"false"	"false"	"false"	"false"
cdmi_create_container	"true"	"true"	"true"	"true"	"true"
cdmi_create_queue	"false"	"false"	"false"	"false"	"false"
cdmi_create_reference	"false"	"false"	"false"	"false"	"false"
cdmi_export_container_cifs	"false"	"false"	"false"	"false"	"false"
cdmi_export_container_nfs	"false"	"false"	"false"	"false"	"false"
cdmi_export_container_iscsi	"false"	"false"	"false"	"false"	"false"
cdmi_export_container_occi	"false"	"false"	"false"	"false"	"false"
cdmi_export_container_webdav	"false"	"false"	"false"	"false"	"false"
cdmi_delete_container	"true"	"true"	"true"	"true"	"true"
cdmi_move_container	"false"	"false"	"false"	"false"	"true"
cdmi_copy_container	"false"	"false"	"false"	"false"	"true"
cdmi_move_dataobject	"false"	"false"	"false"	"false"	"true"
cdmi_copy_dataobject"	"false"	"false"	"false"	"false"	"true"
cdmi_acl	"false"	"false"	"false"	"false"	"true"
cdmi_size	"false"	"false"	"false"	"false"	"true"
cdmi_ctime	"false"	"false"	"false"	"false"	"true"
cdmi_atime	"false"	"false"	"false"	"false"	"true"
cdmi_mtime	"false"	"false"	"false"	"false"	"true"
cdmi_acount	"false"	"false"	"false"	"false"	"false"
cdmi_mcount	"false"	"false"	"false"	"false"	"false"
cdmi_assignedsize	"false"	"false"	"false"	"false"	"false"
cdmi_data_redundancy	""	""	""	""	"false"
cdmi_data_dispersion	"false"	"false"	"false"	"false"	"false"
cdmi_data_retention	"false"	"false"	"false"	"false"	"false"
cdmi_data_autodelete	"false"	"false"	"false"	"false"	"false"
cdmi_data_holds	"false"	"false"	"false"	"false"	"false"
cdmi_encryption	[]	[]	[]	[]	"false"
cdmi_geographic_placement	"false"	"false"	"false"	"false"	"false"
cdmi_immediate_redundancy	""	""	""	""	"false"
cdmi_infrastructure_redundancy	""	""	""	""	"false"
cdmi_latency	"false"	"false"	"false"	"false"	"false"
cdmi_RPO	"false"	"false"	"false"	"false"	"false"
cdmi_RTO	"false"	"false"	"false"	"false"	"false"
cdmi_sanitization_method	[]	[]	[]	[]	"false"
cdmi_throughput	"false"	"false"	"false"	"false"	"false"
cdmi_value_hash	[]	[]	[]	[]	"false"
Domain Object Capabilities
cdmi_create_domain	N/A	N/A	N/A	N/A	"false"
cdmi_delete_domain	N/A	N/A	N/A	N/A	"false"
cdmi_domain_summary	N/A	N/A	N/A	N/A	"false"
cdmi_domain_members	N/A	N/A	N/A	N/A	"false"
cdmi_list_children	N/A	N/A	N/A	N/A	"false"
cdmi_read_metadata	N/A	N/A	N/A	N/A	"false"
cdmi_modify_metadata	N/A	N/A	N/A	N/A	"false"
cdmi_modify_deserialize_domain	N/A	N/A	N/A	N/A	"false"
cdmi_copy_domain	N/A	N/A	N/A	N/A	"false"
cdmi_deserialize_domain	N/A	N/A	N/A	N/A	"false"
cdmi_acl	N/A	N/A	N/A	N/A	"false"
cdmi_size	N/A	N/A	N/A	N/A	"false"
cdmi_ctime	N/A	N/A	N/A	N/A	"false"
cdmi_atime	N/A	N/A	N/A	N/A	"false"
cdmi_mtime	N/A	N/A	N/A	N/A	"false"
cdmi_acount	N/A	N/A	N/A	N/A	"false"
cdmi_mcount	N/A	N/A	N/A	N/A	"false"
cdmi_assignedsize	N/A	N/A	N/A	N/A	"false"
cdmi_data_redundancy	N/A	N/A	N/A	N/A	"false"
cdmi_data_dispersion	N/A	N/A	N/A	N/A	"false"
cdmi_data_retention	N/A	N/A	N/A	N/A	"false"
cdmi_data_autodelete	N/A	N/A	N/A	N/A	"false"
cdmi_data_holds	N/A	N/A	N/A	N/A	"false"
cdmi_encryption	N/A	N/A	N/A	N/A	"false"
cdmi_geographic_placement	N/A	N/A	N/A	N/A	"false"
cdmi_immediate_redundancy	N/A	N/A	N/A	N/A	"false"
cdmi_infrastructure_redundancy	N/A	N/A	N/A	N/A	"false"
cdmi_latency	N/A	N/A	N/A	N/A	"false"
cdmi_RPO	N/A	N/A	N/A	N/A	"false"
cdmi_RTO	N/A	N/A	N/A	N/A	"false"
cdmi_sanitization_method	N/A	N/A	N/A	N/A	"false"
cdmi_throughput	N/A	N/A	N/A	N/A	"false"
cdmi_value_hash	N/A	N/A	N/A	N/A	"false"
Queue Object Capabilities
cdmi_read_value	N/A	N/A	N/A	N/A	"false"
cdmi_read_metadata	N/A	N/A	N/A	N/A	"false"
cdmi_modify_value	N/A	N/A	N/A	N/A	"false"
cdmi_modify_metadata	N/A	N/A	N/A	N/A	"false"
cdmi_modify_deserialize_queue	N/A	N/A	N/A	N/A	"false"
cdmi_delete_queue	N/A	N/A	N/A	N/A	"false"
cdmi_move_queue	N/A	N/A	N/A	N/A	"false"
cdmi_copy_queue	N/A	N/A	N/A	N/A	"false"
cdmi_reference_queue	N/A	N/A	N/A	N/A	"false"
cdmi_acl	N/A	N/A	N/A	N/A	"false"
cdmi_size	N/A	N/A	N/A	N/A	"false"
cdmi_ctime	N/A	N/A	N/A	N/A	"false"
cdmi_atime	N/A	N/A	N/A	N/A	"false"
cdmi_mtime	N/A	N/A	N/A	N/A	"false"
cdmi_acount	N/A	N/A	N/A	N/A	"false"
cdmi_mcount	N/A	N/A	N/A	N/A	"false"
cdmi_assignedsize	N/A	N/A	N/A	N/A	"false"
cdmi_data_redundancy	N/A	N/A	N/A	N/A	"false"
cdmi_data_dispersion	N/A	N/A	N/A	N/A	"false"
cdmi_data_retention	N/A	N/A	N/A	N/A	"false"
cdmi_data_autodelete	N/A	N/A	N/A	N/A	"false"
cdmi_data_holds	N/A	N/A	N/A	N/A	"false"
cdmi_encryption	N/A	N/A	N/A	N/A	"false"
cdmi_geographic_placement	N/A	N/A	N/A	N/A	"false"
cdmi_immediate_redundancy	N/A	N/A	N/A	N/A	"false"
cdmi_infrastructure_redundancy	N/A	N/A	N/A	N/A	"false"
cdmi_latency	N/A	N/A	N/A	N/A	"false"
cdmi_RPO	N/A	N/A	N/A	N/A	"false"
cdmi_RTO	N/A	N/A	N/A	N/A	"false"
cdmi_sanitization_method	N/A	N/A	N/A	N/A	"false"
cdmi_throughput	N/A	N/A	N/A	N/A	"false"
cdmi_value_hash	N/A	N/A	N/A	N/A	"false"
