= PowerCLI =

PowerCLI is a PowerShell-based command-line interface for managing VMware vSphere.

VMware describes PowerCLI as "a powerful command-line tool that lets you automate all aspects of vSphere management, including network, storage, VM, guest OS and more. PowerCLI is distributed as PowerShell modules, and includes over 500 PowerShell cmdlets for managing and automating vSphere and vCloud, along with documentation and samples."

PowerCLI runs in PowerShell on Windows, macOS, and Ubuntu operating systems.
