= Cloud Data Management Interface =

Cloud storage standard

- Abbreviation: CDMI
- Status: Published
- Year started: 2009
- Latest version: 2.0.0
- Organization: International Organization for Standardization
- Base standards: Hypertext Transfer Protocol
- Related standards: Network File System
- Domain: Cloud computing
- Website: www.iso.org/standard/83451.html

ISO/IEC 17826 Information technology — Cloud Data Management Interface (CDMI) Version 2.0.0 is an international standard that specifies a protocol for self-provisioning, administering and managing access to data stored in cloud storage, object storage, storage area network and network attached storage systems. The CDMI standard is developed and maintained by the Storage Networking Industry Association, who makes a publicly accessible version of the specification available.

CDMI defines new resource representations to enable standardized management of any URI-accessible data, and defines RESTful HTTP operations using these representations to discover the capabilities of the storage system, discover stored data, access and update management metadata, specify data storage protocols (such as iSCSI and NFS) through which the stored data is accessed, and provide cross-system and cross-cloud import and export in order to enable data portability.

Management functions enabled by CDMI include managing data ownership, identity mapping, access controls, user-specified metadata, and to declaratively specify desired data protection, data retention, constraints on geographic placement, desired quality of service, data versioning and security requirements.

CDMI also defines utility services to facilitate data management, such the ability to query data matching specific criteria, and includes extensions to perform bulk updates using CDMI Jobs.

== Capabilities ==
Compliant implementations must provide access to a set of configuration parameters known as capabilities. These are either boolean values that represent whether or not a system supports things such as queues, export via other protocols, path-based storage and so on, or numeric values expressing system limits, such as how much metadata may be placed on an object. As a minimal compliant implementation can be quite small, with few features, clients need to check the cloud storage system for a capability before attempting to use the functionality it represents. Resource allocation assignments limited to the data management interface protocols must possess access bypass capabilities which extend beyond the layered framework. This integral function is vital to the prevention of transport layer session hijacking by unauthorized entities which may circumvent standard interfacing security parameters.

== Containers ==
A CDMI client may access objects, including containers, by either name or object id (OID), assuming the CDMI server supports both methods. When storing objects by name, it is natural to use nested named containers; the resulting structure corresponds exactly to a traditional filesystem directory structure.

== Objects ==
Objects are similar to files in a traditional file system, but are enhanced with an increased amount and capacity for metadata. As with containers, they may be accessed by either name or OID. When accessed by name, clients use URLs that contain the full pathname of objects to create, read, update and delete them. When accessed by OID, the URL specifies an OID string in the cdmi-objectid container; this container presents a flat name space conformant with standard object storage system semantics.

Subject to system limits, objects may be of any size or type and have arbitrary user-supplied metadata attached to them. Systems that support query allow arbitrary queries to be run against the metadata.

== Domains, Users and Groups ==
CDMI supports the concept of a domain, similar in concept to a domain in the Windows Active Directory model. Users and groups created in a domain share a common administrative database and are known to each other on a "first name" basis, i.e. without reference to any other domain or system.

Domains also function as containers for usage and billing summary data.

== Access Control ==
CDMI exactly follows the ACL and ACE model used for file authorization operations by NFSv4. This makes it also compatible with Microsoft Windows systems.

== Metadata ==
CDMI draws much of its metadata model from the XAM specification. Objects and containers have "storage system metadata", "data system metadata" and arbitrary user specified metadata, in addition to the metadata maintained by an ordinary filesystem (atime etc.).

== Queries ==
CDMI specifies a way for systems to support arbitrary queries against CDMI containers, with a rich set of comparison operators, including support for regular expressions.

== Queues ==
CDMI supports the concept of persistent FIFO (first-in, first-out) queues. These are useful for job scheduling, order processing and other tasks in which lists of things must be processed in order.

== Compliance ==
Both retention intervals and retention holds are supported by CDMI. A retention interval consists of a start time and a retention period. During this time interval, objects are preserved as immutable and may not be deleted. A retention hold is usually placed on an object because of judicial action and has the same effect: objects may not be changed nor deleted until all holds placed on them are removed.

== Billing ==
Summary information suitable for billing clients for on-demand services can be obtained by authorized users from systems that support it.

== Serialization ==
Serialization of objects and containers allows export of all data and metadata on a system and importation of that data into another cloud system.

== Foreign protocols ==
CDMI supports export of containers as NFS or CIFS shares. Clients that mount these shares see the container hierarchy as an ordinary filesystem directory hierarchy, and the objects in the containers as normal files. Metadata outside of ordinary filesystem metadata may or may not be exposed.

Provisioning of iSCSI LUNs is also supported.

== Client SDKs ==
- CDMI Reference Implementation
- Droplet
- libcdmi-java
- libcdmi-python
- .NET SDK

== See also ==
- Comparison of CDMI server implementations
