= Veeam =

Information technology company

Veeam Software Group
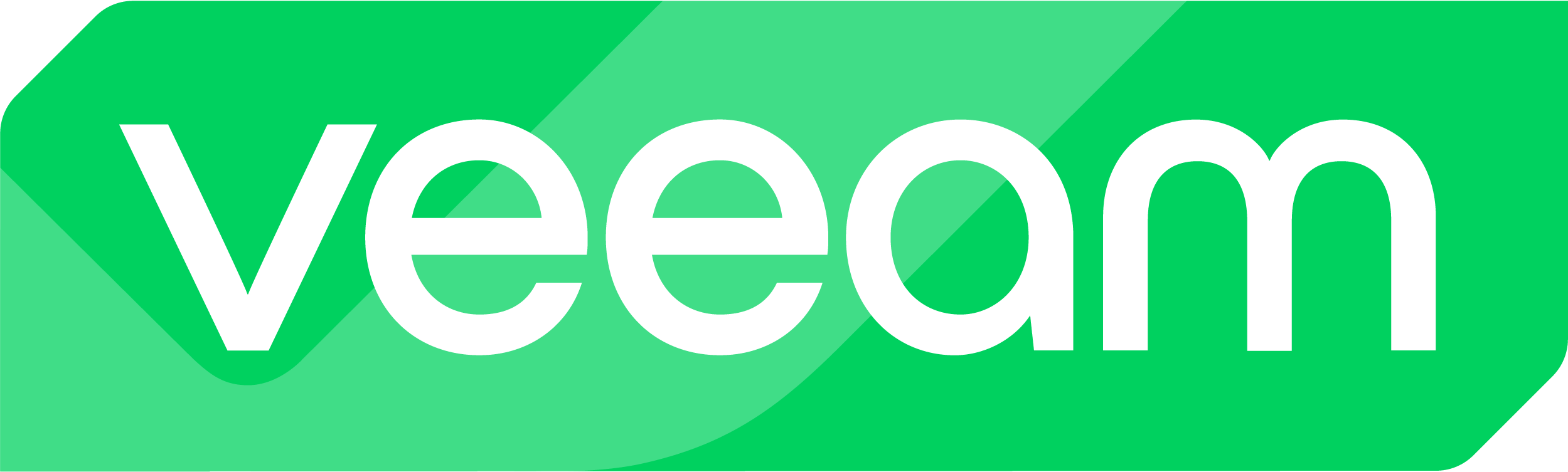
- Type: Private
- Industry: Software industry
- Founded: 2006; 20 years ago
- Founders: Ratmir Timashev; Andrei Baronov
- Headquarters: (global); Columbus, Ohio, United States (corporate)
- Area served: Worldwide
- Key people: Anand Eswaran (CEO)
- Revenue: ▲$1 billion (2019)
- Number of employees: 6,100 (2025)
- Website: www.veeam.com

Veeam Software Group is a privately held US-based information technology company owned by Insight Partners. It develops backup, disaster recovery and modern data protection software for virtual, cloud-native, SaaS, Kubernetes and physical workloads. Veeam Software was co-founded by two Russian entrepreneurs, Ratmir Timashev and Andrei Baronov. While Veeam's start was built on protecting data across virtualized workloads, it has significantly expanded to protect data across a wide variety of platforms from AWS, Azure, Google Cloud, Microsoft 365, Kubernetes, etc. Veeam's current CEO, Anand Eswaran, has been pushing Veeam's strategy to accelerate share in the enterprise with adding several layers to Veeam's partnerships.

The company headquarters is in Kirkland, Washington, United States. The company's international offices include the regional headquarters for EMEA in Paris, France, for the Americas in Columbus, Ohio, for the Middle East in Dubai and for the Asia-Pacific region in Sydney, Australia. The company's largest R&D center is in Prague, Czechia.

== History ==
Ratmir Timashev and Andrei Baronov met in the United States while attending Ohio State University. After selling their previous IT management software company, Aelita Software Corporation, to Quest Software in 2004; the two founded Veeam in 2006, opening the first Veeam office in Saint Petersburg, Russia.

The first Veeam products, Veeam Monitor and Veeam Reporter, provided monitoring, reporting, analysis and documentation for virtual infrastructure. In 2007 Veeam released a free VM backup copy product, FastSCP, which became a basis for building Veeam's data-protection software for hardware virtualization.

In 2014, Veeam held its first conference on data protection and availability called "VeeamON," which took place in Las Vegas, Nevada.

In 2016, Veeam appointed Peter C. McKay, formerly Senior Vice President & General Manager of Americas at VMware, to the position of President and COO. McKay was promoted to a co-CEO role alongside Baronov and then in late 2018 McKay left the company during restructuring, leaving Baronov as sole CEO.

On January 9, 2020, Insight Partners announced that they would purchase Veeam in a $5 billion deal and move the company HQ to the US.

In 2020, Veeam appointed Bill Largent, former chairman of the board, as CEO and chairman. The next year Anand Eswaran replaced Largent as CEO.

== Software ==
In 2008, with 10 employees, the company released Veeam Backup & Replication, a tool that provided VMware vSphere VMs with incremental backups and image-based replication, with built-in data deduplication and compression. Veeam Backup & Replication started supporting Microsoft Hyper-V in 2012.

In 2015, the company extended its product line with a free backup utility for physical endpoints — Veeam Endpoint Backup FREE; it supports PCs running 32 and 64 bit versions of Microsoft Windows OS and integrates with Veeam Backup & Replication. In the same year, it released Veeam FastSCP for Microsoft Azure, a tool for copying files between on-premises and Microsoft Azure VMs.

In 2016, it launched Veeam Backup for Microsoft Office 365, for backing up Office 365 Exchange servers, and Veeam Availability Orchestrator, a multi-hypervisor disaster recovery orchestration software with documenting, testing and reporting capabilities.

In 2017, it introduced three new products: Veeam Agent for Microsoft Windows (successor to Endpoint Backup) and Veeam Agent for Linux — for physical workload data protection with various backup/restore scenarios including cloud, and Veeam Availability Console — a free tool for managing Veeam-powered data protection and disaster recovery in distributed infrastructures and enabling BaaS and DRaaS services delivered through service providers.

In 2020, Veeam announced 16 releases. This includes Veeam Backup & Replication™ v10, Veeam ONE™ v10, Veeam Backup for Nutanix AHV v2, Veeam Service Provider Console v4, Veeam Backup for Microsoft Azure v1, Veeam Availability Orchestrator v3, Veeam Backup for Microsoft Office 365 v5 and Veeam Backup for AWS v3.

== Acquisitions ==
In 2008, the company acquired nworks to further integrate VMware management with Microsoft and Hewlett-Packard enterprise system management platforms.

This resulted in two new products:

- Veeam nworks Management Pack for VMware to directly integrate VMware management into Microsoft System Center Operations Manager
- Veeam nworks Smart Plug-In for VMware to directly integrate VMware management into HP OpenView

In 2012, both products were renamed to Veeam Management Pack and Veeam Smart Plug-In, omitting the word "nworks."

In 2017, Veeam acquired N2WS, a company providing cloud-native enterprise-grade backup and disaster recovery solutions for Amazon Web Services (AWS). For this, the R&D team works in collaboration followed by the acquisition of N2WS by Veeam. In 2019, Veeam sold N2WS back to its original founders after discussions with the US Government.

In 2020, Veeam acquired Kasten, a market leader in backup and disaster recovery solutions for Kubernetes.

In April 2024, Veeam announced it had acquired ransomware incident response and recovery company Coveware; terms were not disclosed, and Coveware will remain operationally independent.

In October 2025, Veeam divulged plans to acquire data security posture management (DSPM) company Securiti AI for $1.725 billion in cash and stock; this transaction is expected to close later in Q4-2025.
