= VCenter =

Centralized management utility for VMware

VMware vCenter Server Appliance
- Other names: VCSA
- Developer: VMware, Inc.
- Release: December 5, 2003; 22 years ago
- Stable release: 9.1.1.0 / September 3, 2026; 2 months ago
- Operating system: Photon OS
- Platform: 32-bit (discontinued in 4.1U2), 64-bit
- Website: www.vmware.com/products/vcenter-server.html

vCenter Server Appliance (VCSA) is the centralized management utility for VMware, and is used to manage virtual machines, multiple ESXi hosts, and all dependent components from a single centralized location.

VMware vMotion and svMotion require the use of vCenter and ESXi hosts.

== vMotion (live migration) ==
Live migration (vMotion) in ESX allows a virtual machine to move between two different hosts. Live storage migration (Storage vMotion) enables live migration of virtual disks on the fly.

During vMotion Live Migration (vLM) of the (RAM) memory of the VM is sent from the running VM to the new VM (the instance on another host that will become the running VM after the vLM). The content of memory is by its nature changing all the time. ESX uses a system where the content is sent to the other VM and then it will check what data is changed and send that, each time smaller blocks. At the last moment it will very briefly 'freeze' the existing VM, transfer the last changes in the RAM content and then start the new VM. The intended effect of this process is to minimize the time during which the VM is suspended; in a best case this will be the time of the final transfer plus the time required to start the new VM.

== svMotion (Storage vMotion) ==
svMotion enables live migration of virtual disks and their home directories without any downtime. svMotion uses a mirror driver to copy virtual hard drives and/or the home directory from the source to destination datastores simultaneously, which keeps everything in sync until the svMotion operation is complete on the destination, at which point the source data is deleted.

There is a performance impact from running svMotion – read IO from the source and write IO on the destination. This can be verified through esxtop. If VAAI is enabled on the ESXi hosts and on the storage array, it will offload the svMotion migration operation to the array instead of going through the VMkernel, which increases the migration speed.
