= VMware ESX =

Enterprise-class, type-1 hypervisor for deploying and serving virtual computers

VMware ESXi
- Developer: VMware (Broadcom)
- Release: March 23, 2001; 25 years ago
- Stable release: 8.0 Update 3g (Build 24859861) / July 29, 2025; 11 months ago
- Platform: IA-32 (x86-32) (discontinued in 4.0 onwards), x86-64, ARM
- Type: Native hypervisor (type 1)
- License: Proprietary
- Website: www.vmware.com/products/esxi-and-esx.html

VMware ESX (formerly named ESXi) and a different historic VMware ESX are enterprise-class, type-1 hypervisors developed by VMware, now a subsidiary of Broadcom, for deploying and serving virtual computers. As type-1 hypervisors, ESX is not a software application that is installed on an operating system (OS); instead, they include and integrate vital OS components, such as a kernel.

Prior to ESXi 3.0 (released in 2008) there was only the original hypervisor named ESX, and for a while both hypervisor products existed (until the final 4.1 release of the historic ESX in 2010). ESXi replaces the Service Console (a rudimentary operating system) with a more closely integrated OS. ESX/ESXi is the primary component in the VMware Infrastructure software suite. However from version 9.0, VMware renamed ESXi to ESX despite the name having already been used before for their earlier hypervisor product.

The name ESX originated as an abbreviation of Elastic Sky X. In September 2004, the replacement for ESX was internally called VMvisor, but later changed to ESXi (as the "i" in ESXi stood for "integrated").

== Architecture ==
ESX runs on bare metal (without running an operating system) unlike other VMware products. It includes its own kernel. In the historic VMware ESX, a Linux kernel was started first and then used to load a variety of specialized virtualization components, including ESX, which is otherwise known as the vmkernel component. The Linux kernel was the primary virtual machine; it was invoked by the service console. At normal run-time, the vmkernel was running on the bare computer, and the Linux-based service console ran as the first virtual machine. VMware dropped development of historic ESX at version 4.1, and now exclusively uses ESXi (since renamed to ESX in 2025), which does not include a Linux kernel at all.

The vmkernel is a microkernel with three interfaces: hardware, guest systems, and the service console (Console OS).

=== Interface to hardware ===
The vmkernel handles CPU and memory directly, using scan-before-execution (SBE) to handle special or privileged CPU instructions and the SRAT (system resource allocation table) to track allocated memory.

Access to other hardware (such as network or storage devices) takes place using modules. At least some of the modules derive from modules used in the Linux kernel. To access these modules, an additional module called vmklinux implements the Linux module interface. According to the README file, "This module contains the Linux emulation layer used by the vmkernel."

The vmkernel uses the device drivers:

1. net/e100
2. net/e1000
3. net/e1000e
4. net/bnx2
5. net/tg3
6. net/forcedeth
7. net/pcnet32
8. block/cciss
9. scsi/adp94xx
10. scsi/aic7xxx
11. scsi/aic79xx
12. scsi/ips
13. scsi/lpfcdd-v732
14. scsi/megaraid2
15. scsi/mptscsi_2xx
16. scsi/qla2200-v7.07
17. scsi/megaraid_sas
18. scsi/qla4010
19. scsi/qla4022
20. scsi/vmkiscsi
21. scsi/aacraid_esx30
22. scsi/lpfcdd-v7xx
23. scsi/qla2200-v7xx

These drivers mostly equate to those described in VMware's hardware compatibility list. All these modules fall under the GPL. Programmers have adapted them to run with the vmkernel: VMware Inc. has changed the module-loading and some other minor things.

=== Service console ===
In the historic ESX, the Service Console is a vestigial general purpose operating system most significantly used as bootstrap for the VMware kernel, vmkernel, and secondarily used as a management interface. Both of these Console Operating System functions were deprecated since historic ESX development stopped at version 4.1 and so the next version of 5.0 was ESXi only. The Service Console, for all intents and purposes, is the operating system used to interact with VMware ESX and the virtual machines that run on the server.

=== Purple Screen of Death ===
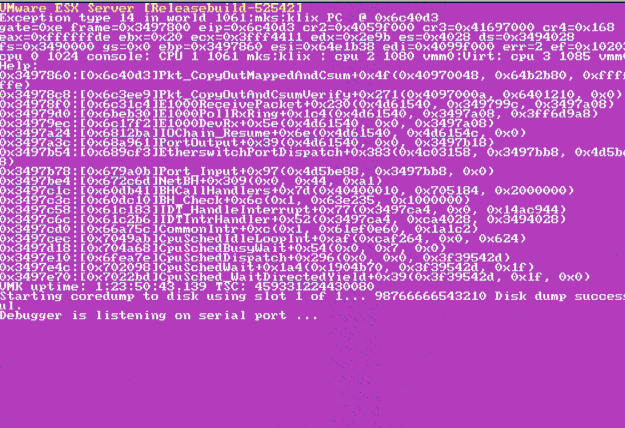
A purple diagnostic screen as seen in VMware ESX Server 3.0

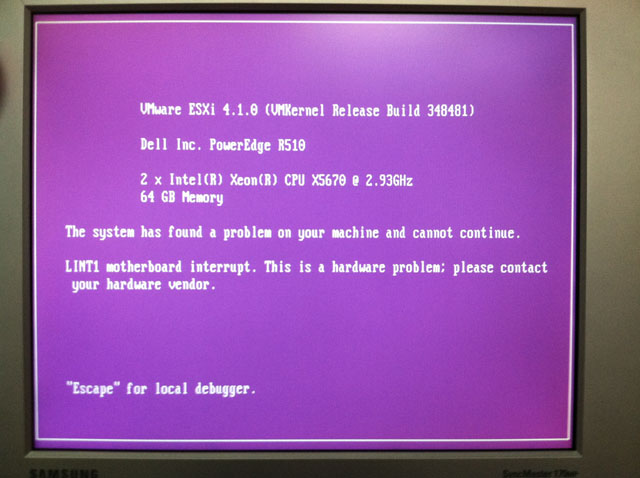
A purple diagnostic screen from VMware ESXi 4.1

In the event of a hardware error, the vmkernel can catch a Machine Check Exception. This results in an error message displayed on a purple diagnostic screen. This is colloquially known as a purple diagnostic screen, or purple screen of death (PSoD, named by analogy to the blue screen of death (BSoD)).

Upon displaying a purple diagnostic screen, the vmkernel writes debug information to the core dump partition. This information, together with the error codes displayed on the purple diagnostic screen can be used by VMware support to determine the cause of the problem.

== Versions ==
VMware ESX used to be available in two main types: ESX (version 4.1 and earlier) and ESXi (version 3.5 onwards), but as of version 5, the original ESX has been discontinued in favor of ESXi (since renamed to ESX from version 9.0 onwards).

Historic ESX and ESXi before version 5.0 do not support Windows 8/Windows 2012. These Microsoft operating systems can only run on ESXi 5.x or later.

VMware ESX (formerly ESXi) is a smaller-footprint version of ESX which does not include the ESX Service Console nor use a Linux Kernel. Before Broadcom acquired VMware, it was available - without the need to purchase a vCenter license - as a free download from VMware, with some features disabled.

ESXi stood for "ESX integrated".

VMware ESX (formerly ESXi) originated as a compact version of VMware ESX (historic) that allowed for a smaller 32 MB disk footprint on the host. With a simple configuration console for mostly network configuration and remote based VMware Infrastructure Client Interface, this allows for more resources to be dedicated to the guest environments.

Two variations of ESX exist:

- VMware ESX Installable
- VMware ESX Embedded Edition

The same media can be used to install either of these variations depending on the size of the target media. One can upgrade ESXi to VMware Infrastructure 3 or to VMware vSphere 4.0 ESXi.

ESXi was originally named VMware ESX Server ESXi edition, through several revisions the ESXi product finally became VMware ESXi 3. New editions then followed: ESXi 3.5 up to ESXi 8, before being renamed to ESX with version 9.

== GPL violation lawsuit ==
VMware was sued by Christoph Hellwig, a Linux kernel developer. The lawsuit began on March 5, 2015. It was alleged that VMware had misappropriated portions of the Linux kernel, and, following a dismissal by the court in 2016, Hellwig announced he would file an appeal.

The appeal was dismissed by the German court in February 2019, on the basis of not meeting "procedural requirements for the burden of proof of the plaintiff".

In the last stage of the lawsuit in March 2019, the Hamburg Higher Regional Court also rejected the claim on procedural grounds. Following this, VMware officially announced that they would remove the code in question. This followed with Hellwig withdrawing his case, and withholding further legal action.

== Related or additional products ==
The following products operate in conjunction with ESX:

- vCenter Server, enables monitoring and management of multiple ESX, ESXi and GSX servers. In addition, users must install it to run infrastructure services such as:
  - vMotion (transferring virtual machines between servers on the fly whilst they are running, with zero downtime)
  - svMotion aka Storage vMotion (transferring virtual machines between Shared Storage LUNs on the fly, with zero downtime)
  - Enhanced vMotion aka evMotion (a simultaneous vMotion and svMotion, supported on version 5.1 and above)
  - Distributed Resource Scheduler (DRS) (automated vMotion based on host/VM load requirements/demands)
  - High Availability (HA) (restarting of Virtual Machine Guest Operating Systems in the event of a physical ESX host failure)
  - Fault Tolerance (FT) (almost instant stateful fail-over of a VM in the event of a physical host failure)
- Converter, enables users to create VMware ESX Server- or Workstation-compatible virtual machines from either physical machines or from virtual machines made by other virtualization products. Converter replaces the VMware "P2V Assistant" and "Importer" products — P2V Assistant allowed users to convert physical machines into virtual machines, and Importer allowed the import of virtual machines from other products into VMware Workstation.
- vSphere Client (formerly VMware Infrastructure Client), enables monitoring and management of a single instance of ESX or ESXi server. After ESX 4.1, vSphere Client was no longer available from the ESX/ESXi server but must be downloaded from the VMware web site.

=== Cisco Nexus 1000v ===
Network-connectivity between ESX hosts and the VMs running on it relies on virtual NICs (inside the VM) and virtual switches. The latter exists in two versions: the 'standard' vSwitch allowing several VMs on a single ESX host to share a physical NIC and the 'distributed vSwitch' where the vSwitches on different ESX hosts together form one logical switch. Cisco offers in their Cisco Nexus product-line the Nexus 1000v, an advanced version of the standard distributed vSwitch. A Nexus 1000v consists of two parts: a supervisor module (VSM) and on each ESX host a virtual Ethernet module (VEM). The VSM runs as a virtual appliance within the ESX cluster or on dedicated hardware (Nexus 1010 series) and the VEM runs as a module on each host and replaces a standard dvS (distributed virtual switch) from VMware.

Configuration of the switch is done on the VSM using the standard NX-OS CLI. It offers capabilities to create standard port-profiles which can then be assigned to virtual machines using vCenter.

There are several differences between the standard dvS and the N1000v; one is that the Cisco switch generally has full support for network technologies such as LACP link aggregation or that the VMware switch supports new features such as routing based on physical NIC load. However, the main difference lies in the architecture: Nexus 1000v is working in the same way as a physical Ethernet switch does while dvS is relying on information from ESX. This has consequences for example in scalability where the Kappa limit for a N1000v is 2048 virtual ports against 60000 for a dvS.

The Nexus1000v is developed in co-operation between Cisco and VMware and uses the API of the dvS.

=== Third-party management tools ===
Because VMware ESX is a leader in the server-virtualization market, software and hardware vendors offer a range of tools to integrate their products or services with ESX. Examples are the products from Veeam Software with backup and management applications and a plugin to monitor and manage ESX using HP OpenView, Quest Software with a range of management and backup-applications and most major backup-solution providers have plugins or modules for ESX. Using Microsoft Operations Manager (SCOM) 2007/2012 with a Bridgeways ESX management pack gives the user a realtime ESX datacenter health view.

Hardware vendors such as Hewlett Packard Enterprise and Dell include tools to support the use of ESX(i) on their hardware platforms. An example is the ESX module for Dell's OpenManage management platform.

VMware has added a Web Client since v5 but it will work on vCenter only and does not contain all features.

== Known limitations ==
As of September 2020, these are the known limitations of VMware ESXi 7.0 U1.

=== Infrastructure limitations ===
Some maximums in ESXi Server 7.0 may influence the design of data centers:

- Guest system maximum RAM: 24 TB
- Host system maximum RAM: 24 TB
- Number of hosts in a high availability or Distributed Resource Scheduler cluster: 96
- Maximum number of processors per virtual machine: 768
- Maximum number of processors per host: 768
- Maximum number of virtual CPUs per physical CPU core: 32
- Maximum number of virtual machines per host: 1024
- Maximum number of virtual CPUs per fault tolerant virtual machine: 8
- Maximum guest system RAM per fault tolerant virtual machine: 128 GB
- VMFS5 maximum volume size: 64 TB, but maximum file size is 62 TB -512 bytes
- Maximum Video memory per virtual machine: 4 GB

=== Performance limitations ===
In terms of performance, virtualization imposes a cost in the additional work the CPU has to perform to virtualize the underlying hardware. Instructions that perform this extra work, and other activities that require virtualization, tend to lie in operating system calls. In an unmodified operating system, OS calls introduce the greatest portion of virtualization "overhead".

Paravirtualization or other virtualization techniques may help with these issues. VMware developed the Virtual Machine Interface for this purpose, and selected operating systems currently support this. A comparison between full virtualization and paravirtualization for the ESX Server shows that in some cases paravirtualization is much faster.

=== Network limitations ===
When using the advanced and extended network capabilities by using the Cisco Nexus 1000v distributed virtual switch the following network-related limitations apply:

- 64 ESX/ESXi hosts per VSM (Virtual Supervisor Module)
- 2048 virtual Ethernet interfaces per VMware vDS (virtual distributed switch)

- and a maximum of 216 virtual interfaces per ESX/ESXi host

- 2048 active VLANs (one to be used for communication between VEMs and VSM)
- 2048 port-profiles
- 32 physical NICs per ESX/ESXi (physical) host
- 256 port-channels per VMware vDS (virtual distributed switch)

- and a maximum of 8 port-channels per ESX/ESXi host

=== Fibre Channel Fabric limitations ===
Regardless of the type of virtual SCSI adapter used, there are these limitations:

- Maximum of 4 Virtual SCSI adapters, one of which should be dedicated to virtual disk use
- Maximum of 64 SCSI LUNs per adapter

== See also ==
- Comparison of platform virtualization software
- KVM Linux Kernel-based Virtual Machine – an open-source hypervisor platform
- Hyperjacking – Technique for compromising hypervisor software
- Proxmox Virtual Environment – a Free and Open-Source competitor of VMware ESX from Proxmox Server Solutions GmbH
- Hyper-V – a competitor of VMware ESX from Microsoft
- Virtual appliance
- Virtual disk image
- Virtual machine
- VMware VMFS
- x86 virtualization
- Xen – an open-source hypervisor platform
