= VMware vSphere =

VMware's cloud computing virtualization platform

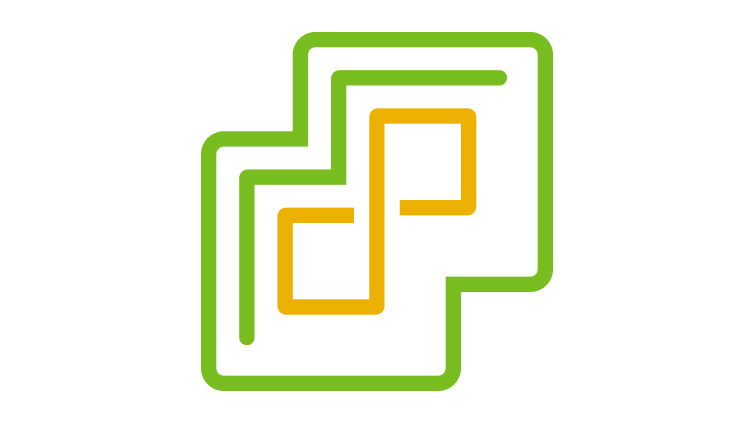
- Developer: VMware
- Release: April 21, 2009
- Stable release: 9.1 / May 12, 2026; 2 months ago
- License: Proprietary
- Website: vmware.com/products/cloud-infrastructure/vsphere

VMware vSphere (formerly VMware Infrastructure 4) is VMware's cloud computing virtualization platform.

It includes vCenter Configuration Manager, as well as vCenter Application Discovery Manager, and the ability of vMotion to move more than one virtual machine at a time from one host server to another.

On February 12, 2024, VMware owner Broadcom discontinued general availability of vSphere Hypervisor free edition.

== Releases ==
- On February 10, 2011 VMware released Update 1 for vSphere 4.1 to add support for RHEL 6, RHEL 5.6, SLES 11 SP1 for VMware, Ubuntu 10.10, and Solaris 10 Update 9.
- On July 12, 2011, VMware released version 5 of VMware vSphere.
- On August 27, 2012, VMware released vSphere 5.1. This extended vSphere to include VMware vSphere Storage Appliance, vSphere Data Protection, vSphere Replication and vShield Endpoint.
- In May 2014 SAP and VMware announced the availability of SAP HANA for production use on VMware vSphere 5.5.
- On February 3, 2015, VMware announced vSphere 6.0 with many new features and enhancements.
- On October 18, 2016, VMware announced vSphere 6.5 focusing on a simplified experience and improving security features.
- On April 17, 2018, VMware announced vSphere 6.7 focusing on simple and efficient management at scale, further improved security features, a universal application platform, and seamless hybrid cloud experience.
- On March 10, 2020, VMware announced vSphere 7.0.
- On September 15, 2020, VMware announced vSphere 7.0 Update 1.
- On March 9, 2021, VMware announced vSphere 7.0 Update 2.
- On August 30, 2022, VMware announced vSphere 8.0.

== See also ==
- PowerCLI
- vCenter is the centralized management utility
- VMware ESX/ESXi, the hypervisor operating system component
- VMware VMFS, the VMware file system component
