= LXC =

Operating system-level virtualization for Linux

Linux Containers
- Developers: Kernel: Virtuozzo, IBM, Google, Eric Biederman and others; Userspace: Daniel Lezcano, Serge Hallyn, Stéphane Graber and others
- Initial release: August 6, 2008; 17 years ago
- Stable release: 6.0.6 / 27 February 2026; 2 months ago
- Written in: C, Shell
- Operating system: Linux
- Platform: x86, IA-64, PowerPC, SPARC, Itanium, ARM
- Type: OS-level virtualization
- License: GNU LGPL v.2.1 (some components under GNU GPL v2 and BSD)
- Website: linuxcontainers.org
- Repository: github.com/lxc

Linux Containers (LXC) is an operating system-level virtualization method for running multiple isolated Linux systems (containers) on a control host using a single Linux kernel.

The Linux kernel provides the cgroups functionality that allows limitation and prioritization of resources (CPU, memory, block I/O, network, etc.) without the need for starting any virtual machines, and also the namespace isolation functionality that allows complete isolation of an application's view of the operating environment, including process trees, networking, user IDs and mounted file systems.

LXC combines the kernel's cgroups and support for isolated namespaces to provide an isolated environment for applications. Early versions of Docker used LXC as the container execution driver, though LXC was replaced as the default in version 0.9.0 and was deprecated in 1.8.0, before the driver was removed in 1.10.0.

== Overview ==
LXC was initially developed by IBM, as part of a collaboration between several parties looking to add namespaces to the kernel. It provides operating system-level virtualization through a virtual environment that has its own process and network space, instead of creating a full-fledged virtual machine. LXC relies on the Linux kernel cgroups functionality that was released in version 2.6.24. It also relies on other kinds of namespace isolation functionality, which were developed and integrated into the mainline Linux kernel.

== Security ==
Originally, LXC containers were not as secure as other OS-level virtualization methods such as OpenVZ: in Linux kernels before 3.8, the root user of the guest system could run arbitrary code on the host system with root privileges, just as they can in chroot jails. Starting with the LXC 1.0 release, it is possible to run containers as regular users on the host using "unprivileged containers". Unprivileged containers are more limited in that they cannot access hardware directly. However, even privileged containers should provide adequate isolation in the LXC 1.0 security model, if properly configured.

== Alternatives ==
LXC is similar to other OS-level virtualization technologies on Linux such as OpenVZ and Linux-VServer, as well as those on other operating systems such as FreeBSD jails, AIX Workload Partitions and Solaris Containers. In contrast to OpenVZ, LXC works in the vanilla Linux kernel requiring no additional patches to be applied to the kernel sources. Version 1 of LXC, which was released on 20 February 2014 as a long-term supported version, was supported for five years. Version 4.0 of LXC 4.0 was supported until June 1, 2025 and LXC 5.0 will be until June 1, 2027.

=== LXD ===
LXD is an alternative Linux container manager, written in Go. It is built on top of LXC and aims to provide a better user experience. It is a container hypervisor providing an API to manage LXC containers. The LXD project was started in 2015 and was sponsored from the start by Canonical Ltd., the company behind Ubuntu. On 4 July 2023, the LinuxContainers project announced that Canonical had decided to take over the LXD project but a fork called Incus had been created. On August 25, 2023, LXD version 5.17 was officially released under the control of Canonical, providing support for OpenZFS 2.2 delegation capabilities.

== See also ==
- Open Container Initiative
- Container Linux (formerly CoreOS Linux)
- Docker, a project automating the deployment of applications inside software containers
- Apache Mesos, a retired large-scale cluster management platform based on container isolation
- Operating system-level virtualization implementations
- Proxmox Virtual Environment, an open-source server virtualization management platform supporting LXC containers and KVM
- Anbox, uses LXC to execute Android applications in other Linux distributions
