= Apple container =

Utility to run Linux containers on macOS

Apple Container is an open-source command-line utility and runtime environment developed by Apple Inc. for creating, managing, and running Linux containers on macOS. Introduced in 2025 at WWDC, the tool is written in Swift and specifically optimized for Apple silicon. Unlike traditional container engines like Docker Desktop, which typically run all containers within a single shared Linux virtual machine (VM), Apple Container utilizes a "one-VM-per-container" architecture to improve security and resource isolation.

== Overview ==
Apple Container provides a native macOS experience for developers enabling them to run Linux-based containers. It leverages the macOS Virtualization.framework to spawn lightweight virtual machines that host OCI-compliant containers.

== Architecture ==
The system architecture of Apple Container differs from classic macOS container solutions such as Docker Desktop, podman or Rancher:

Isolation Model
Each container runs in its own dedicated, lightweight Linux virtual machine using Kata container. This provides hardware-level isolation between containers, reducing the attack surface compared to shared-kernel models.
MacOS native
The tool is built using Swift and integrates directly with macOS system frameworks. It is built on top of the apple/containerization Swift package, which provides the low-level APIs for interacting with the Linux kernel and the macOS Virtualization layer, with no need for an additional hypervisor.

== Limitations ==
As of March 2026 (version 0.11.0), Apple container still has limitations that prevent it from being a full Docker replacement. Examples of things that are not fully supported yet:

Docker Compose
The most significant limitation is arguably the lack of native support for Docker Compose. While there are a few projects that bridge that gap partially (such as Container-Compose), these is not native support
DevContainer
While there is some support to dev containers, including in VSCode there are still issues preventing it from fully supporting DevContainers, such as networking issues, no support for setup scripts etc.
