= Proxmox Virtual Environment =

Open-source server virtualization platform

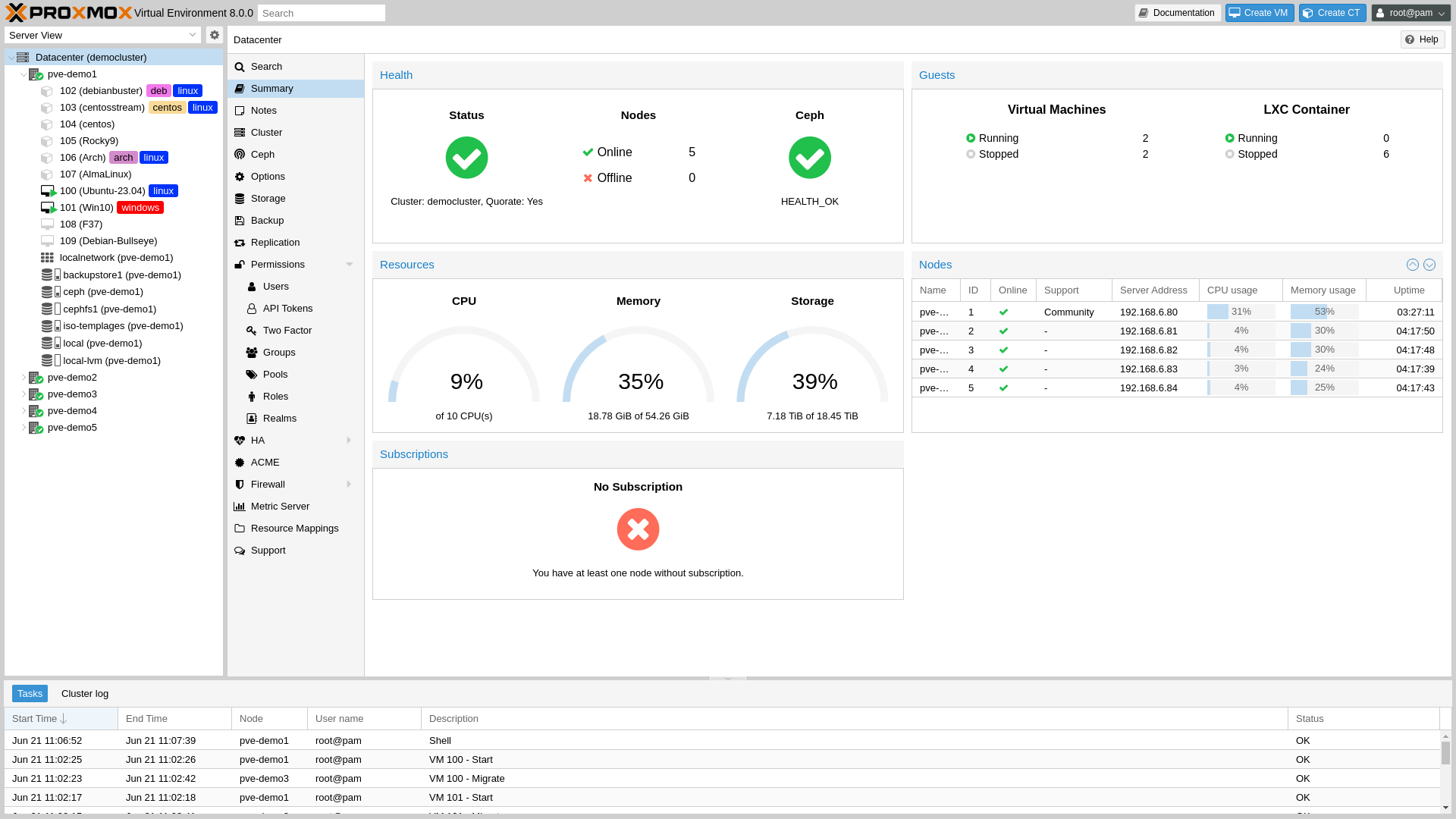
- Proxmox VE 8.0 administration interface screenshot
- Developer: Proxmox Server Solutions GmbH
- Written in: Perl, Rust
- OS family: Linux (Unix-like)
- Working state: Current
- Source model: Free and open-source software
- Initial release: 15 April 2008; 18 years ago
- Latest release: 9.2 / 21 May 2026; 5 months ago
- Repository: git.proxmox.com
- Available in: 31 languages
- Update method: APT
- Package manager: dpkg
- Supported platforms: x86-64, Arm64
- Kernel type: Monolithic (Linux)
- Userland: GNU
- Default user interface: Web-based, command-line and REST API
- License: GNU AGPLv3
- Official website: www.proxmox.com/en/proxmox-virtual-environment/

Proxmox Virtual Environment (Proxmox VE or PVE) is a free and open-source server virtualization platform developed by Proxmox Server Solutions GmbH. It is based on Debian and combines Kernel-based Virtual Machine (KVM) for hardware-assisted virtual machines with LXC for Linux system containers in a single management environment.

Management is available through a web interface, command-line tools and a REST API. The platform integrates clustering, high availability, software-defined networking, storage management, backup and restore, a distributed firewall and live migration. Proxmox VE uses a Proxmox-maintained Linux kernel based on the Ubuntu kernel.

Builds were limited to x86-64 until August 2026, when Proxmox released Proxmox VE 9.2 for Arm64 as its first officially supported build on a second processor architecture.

Proxmox VE is licensed under the GNU Affero General Public License, version 3. The complete feature set can be used without purchasing a commercial subscription; Proxmox sells optional subscriptions that provide access to its enterprise package repository and, depending on the plan, vendor technical support.

== History ==
Proxmox Server Solutions GmbH was founded in Vienna in 2005 by Martin Maurer and Dietmar Maurer. The developers' early virtualization work used OpenVZ, and KVM was incorporated as it became available in the Linux kernel. A 2010 LWN.net review identified the combination of KVM virtual machines and OpenVZ containers in one integrated system as a distinguishing feature of Proxmox VE at the time.

The first public release, version 0.9, was made on 15 April 2008, and the first stable 1.0 release followed in October 2008. Early releases provided a bare-metal Debian-based installation and a web interface for managing both KVM and OpenVZ guests.

Proxmox VE 2.0, released in 2012, introduced a redesigned cluster stack using Corosync, a REST API, live snapshots and a new web interface, and changed the project license from GPLv2 to AGPLv3. Version 3.x added VM templates, cloning, SPICE console access, Ceph integration, a firewall and ZFS support.

Version 4.0 replaced OpenVZ with LXC and introduced a redesigned high-availability manager. Version 5.0 introduced a built-in storage-replication stack, and version 5.1 integrated Ceph management for hyper-converged deployments. Version 7.3, released in November 2022, added initial support for a cluster resource scheduler and support for updating air-gapped systems using the new Proxmox Offline Mirror tool. Version 8.1, released in November 2023, added a software-defined networking stack and Secure Boot compatibility.

=== Releases since 2024 ===
Proxmox VE 8.2, released in April 2024, added an integrated wizard for importing virtual machines from VMware ESXi, an unattended automated installation mechanism and backup fleecing, in which temporary local storage reduces the effect of slow backup storage on a running VM. Version 8.3 expanded OVF and OVA import through the web interface, and version 8.4, released in April 2025, added live migration for running VMs using supported mediated devices such as NVIDIA vGPU, an API for third-party backup providers, and virtiofs directory sharing between host and guest.

Proxmox VE 9.0 was released in August 2025 and moved the base system to Debian 13 "Trixie". It added snapshots for thick-provisioned shared LVM storage, including Fibre Channel and iSCSI SAN configurations, software-defined-networking fabrics, high-availability resource-affinity rules and a redesigned mobile interface. Version 9.1 added support for using Open Container Initiative images as templates for LXC containers.

Version 9.2, released in May 2026, introduced a dynamic cluster load balancer, additional SDN features including WireGuard- and BGP-based fabrics, graphical management of custom CPU models, and the ability to disarm and re-arm the high-availability manager cluster-wide during planned maintenance, which suspends HA actions such as node fencing while preserving resource states so that guests return to their previous state and placement afterwards. The release is based on Debian 13.5, with Linux kernel 7.0 as the stable default, QEMU 11, LXC 7 and ZFS 2.4.

In July 2026 Proxmox announced a collaboration with NVIDIA under which Proxmox VE joined the NVIDIA Mission Control partner ecosystem, providing a high-availability virtualization layer for the management services of large accelerated-computing deployments rather than hosting accelerated workloads directly. The company said Proxmox VE was being engineered to support the bring-up of NVIDIA's Grace and Vera CPU architectures.

In August 2026 Proxmox published Proxmox VE 9.2 for Arm64, which shares its code base, package repositories and release lifecycle with the x86-64 build. Officially supported hardware at launch was limited to systems using the NVIDIA Grace and Vera architectures, developed in collaboration with NVIDIA and Supermicro, with other UEFI-based Armv8-A and Armv9-A systems supported on a best-effort basis. Live migration is not supported between nodes of different architectures.

== Features ==
=== Virtual machines and containers ===
Proxmox VE supports two forms of virtualization. KVM, together with QEMU, provides hardware-assisted virtual machines capable of running Linux, Windows and other operating systems. On x86 systems, hardware virtualization extensions such as Intel VT-x or AMD-V are required for accelerated KVM virtualization.

LXC provides operating-system-level virtualization for Linux guests. Containers share the host kernel and generally require fewer resources than full virtual machines, but they are limited to Linux userspace environments compatible with the host kernel. Beginning with Proxmox VE 9.1, OCI images can be downloaded from registries or uploaded and used as templates for LXC containers; depending on the image, Proxmox can provision them as system or application containers.

=== OpenVZ (legacy) ===
Through Proxmox VE 3.4, OpenVZ was used for container virtualization. OpenVZ containers shared a single host kernel and supported only Linux guests. Version 4.0 replaced OpenVZ with LXC, and upgrade tools were provided to convert existing OpenVZ containers.

=== Management interfaces ===
The principal management interface is a web application available on each Proxmox VE node. Most administrative functions are also exposed through command-line tools and a REST API. Proxmox also provides a mobile application for managing PVE environments. Version 9.0 introduced a redesigned mobile web interface.

The ISO installer provides graphical and text-based installation interfaces. Automated installation from the ISO was introduced in Proxmox VE 8.2 using answer files and related tooling.

=== Storage ===
Proxmox VE supports local and shared storage through a plugin-based storage subsystem. Documented back ends include directory storage, LVM and LVM-thin, ZFS, NFS, CIFS/SMB, iSCSI, Ceph RBD and CephFS, and Proxmox Backup Server storage. Btrfs is also documented, with parts of its integration designated a technology preview.

Virtual disks can be stored as raw volumes or in file formats such as qcow2, depending on the selected storage back end. Proxmox VE can manage ZFS locally and can deploy and administer Ceph storage as part of a hyper-converged cluster. Version 9.0 added snapshot support for thick-provisioned shared LVM storage, including configurations backed by iSCSI or Fibre Channel SANs. Version 9.2 made Ceph Tentacle (20.2) available as a stable option alongside Ceph Squid (19.2).

=== Networking and firewall ===
Networking can be configured through Linux bridges, bonding, VLANs and a software-defined networking stack. The SDN system supports centrally managed zones and virtual networks, with later releases adding EVPN, OSPF, BGP and WireGuard-based capabilities.

Proxmox VE includes a distributed firewall that can be configured at datacenter, host and guest levels. The established firewall implementation is based on iptables; Proxmox VE 8.2 introduced an alternative nftables-based implementation as a technology preview.

=== Clustering and high availability ===
Multiple Proxmox VE servers can be joined into a cluster. Cluster communication and membership use Corosync, while configuration data is replicated through the Proxmox Cluster File System (pmxcfs), a FUSE-based distributed configuration database.

The integrated high-availability manager can monitor configured VMs and containers and restart them on another node when a node fails. Ceph can be deployed as shared distributed storage for cluster guests, while ZFS replication can be used for asynchronous replication of guest volumes between nodes.

The cluster resource scheduler gained resource-affinity and anti-affinity rules in version 9.0. Version 9.2 added a dynamic mode that uses node and guest resource utilization to rebalance HA-managed workloads by live-migrating guests while respecting configured HA rules, and allows the HA manager to be disarmed cluster-wide for planned maintenance.

=== Live migration and import ===
Proxmox VE supports live migration of running virtual machines between nodes in a cluster. Depending on the storage configuration, migration can either use shared storage or move local virtual disks between nodes. Version 8.4 added live migration for VMs using supported mediated devices when compatible hardware and drivers are present on both source and destination nodes.

An integrated import wizard added in version 8.2 can connect to VMware ESXi as an import source and map much of an imported VM's configuration to the Proxmox VE configuration model. Later releases expanded OVF and OVA import through the web interface. Cross-cluster live migration is available through Proxmox Datacenter Manager for managed Proxmox VE environments.

=== Backup and restore ===
Proxmox VE includes the vzdump backup utility for backing up virtual machines and containers and supports scheduled backup jobs through the web interface and command line. It integrates directly with Proxmox Backup Server (PBS), which provides deduplicated incremental backup storage, encryption, retention policies, verification and restore functionality. Proxmox VE 8.4 also introduced an API intended for integration by third-party backup providers.

=== Authentication and security ===
Authentication realms can use Proxmox VE's internal user database, PAM, LDAP, Active Directory or OpenID Connect. Role-based permissions can be assigned to users, groups and API tokens. Multi-factor authentication options include TOTP, WebAuthn and YubiKey OTP. Secure Boot support was added in Proxmox VE 8.1.

=== Console and hardware passthrough ===
Graphical VM consoles are available through SPICE and an HTML5 implementation of VNC (noVNC), with access proxied through the host's authenticated web service. Proxmox VE supports PCIe device passthrough to virtual machines using IOMMU functionality such as Intel VT-d or AMD-Vi. The web interface has supported configuring PCIe passthrough since the 5.x series.

=== Virtual appliances ===
Proxmox VE can download pre-built Linux container templates through the management interface, allowing administrators to create containers from prepared operating-system images. Earlier versions distributed OpenVZ-based virtual appliance templates in the same way.

== VMware migration and adoption ==
Broadcom completed its acquisition of VMware on 22 November 2023. VMware subsequently transitioned its portfolio away from perpetual licensing toward subscription licensing and consolidated many products into a smaller number of bundled offerings. The free edition of VMware's vSphere Hypervisor, commonly known as ESXi, was also discontinued.

The licensing changes prompted many VMware customers to evaluate alternatives. Gartner reported in April 2024 that clients renewing VMware contracts were encountering large price increases, often around twice their previous costs, following the shift to subscriptions, changes in licensing metrics and product bundling.

Proxmox added its integrated ESXi import wizard during this period. Ars Technica described the feature as a migration path for users affected by Broadcom's VMware changes. In May 2024, backup-software vendor Veeam announced Proxmox VE support in response to what it described as strong customer demand. The Register reported that Proxmox had been drawing increased interest as organizations reconsidered virtualization platforms following VMware's licensing and pricing changes.

Proxmox's own published host counts increased over the same period. The company reported more than one million installed hosts when version 8.2 was released in April 2024 and approximately 1.3 million by November 2024, when it said that about 300,000 active hosts had been added during the preceding months. In the version 8.3 announcement, Proxmox chief operating officer Tim Marx attributed new market opportunities in part to recent pricing changes in the virtualization market. The company reported more than two million hosts in May 2026 and more than 2.3 million active Proxmox VE servers in September 2026.

== Development and commercial model ==
Proxmox VE is developed by Proxmox Server Solutions GmbH, an Austrian company headquartered in Vienna and founded in 2005 by Martin Maurer and Dietmar Maurer. In September 2026 the company announced that enterprise support would expand to 24-hour, year-round coverage from 19 October 2026, covering Proxmox VE, Proxmox Backup Server and Proxmox Datacenter Manager. Premium subscriptions received the coverage at launch, Standard subscriptions during a later onboarding period, while service levels for Basic subscriptions were unchanged. Proxmox attributed the expansion to growth in its installed base and to demand for continuous vendor-provided support from cloud, healthcare, government, finance and other enterprise users. At the same time it established Proxmox North America Inc., a subsidiary in Kingston, Ontario, Canada, handling regional sales, contracts, procurement, training and business-hours technical support while core product development remained in Vienna.

The software is available under AGPLv3 and can be installed and operated without a paid subscription. Commercial subscriptions are sold per occupied physical CPU socket rather than by core count, and Proxmox states that all Proxmox VE features are available at every subscription level, with paid tiers differing in repository access and support entitlements. The company also sells instructor-led training directly and through authorized training partners.

== Related Proxmox software ==
Proxmox Server Solutions develops several other products that can integrate with Proxmox VE.

=== Proxmox Backup Server ===
Proxmox Backup Server (PBS) is a separate open-source backup platform for virtual machines, containers and physical systems. It provides deduplicated incremental backups, compression, authenticated encryption, retention policies, verification jobs and restore functionality. Proxmox VE can use PBS as a storage target directly from its management interface.

=== Proxmox Mail Gateway ===
Proxmox Mail Gateway is an independently deployable email-security product providing spam and malware filtering, mail-flow rules, quarantine functions and mail statistics.

=== Proxmox Datacenter Manager ===
Proxmox Datacenter Manager (PDM) is a separate centralized management application for multiple Proxmox VE clusters and Proxmox Backup Server installations. It is written in Rust, based on Debian and released under the AGPLv3. After alpha and beta releases during 2024 and 2025, stable version 1.0 was released on 4 December 2025, adding centralized monitoring and administration of multiple Proxmox environments, aggregated metrics, centralized update management and cross-cluster live migration. Version 1.1, released in May 2026, added centralized automated-installation workflows using answer files, a central registry for managing and assigning subscription keys, native monitoring of all connected Ceph clusters from a single panel covering OSDs, monitors, managers, metadata servers, pools and CephFS, and a cross-remote view for guest and snapshot operations across managed systems. Customers with active enterprise support plans for their managed Proxmox VE and Proxmox Backup Server systems receive Proxmox Datacenter Manager updates and support without a separate subscription key.

=== Proxmox Offline Mirror ===
Proxmox Offline Mirror is a command-line tool for maintaining a local APT mirror of Proxmox and Debian repositories, intended for hosts that cannot reach the public repositories directly, including air-gapped systems. The mirrored repository can be made available to those hosts through removable media or a network share, and the tool can also activate Proxmox subscription keys for them. It was first released in September 2022 and is published under the AGPLv3; support for updating air-gapped systems from such a mirror was introduced in Proxmox VE 7.3.

== See also ==
- Comparison of platform virtualization software
- Kernel-based Virtual Machine (KVM)
- LXC
- oVirt
- XCP-ng
