= Crouton (disambiguation) =

A crouton is a piece of sautéed or rebaked bread, often cubed and seasoned, that is used to add texture and flavor to salads, as an accompaniment to soups, or eaten as a snack food.

Crouton may also refer to:

- Crouton (computing), a set of scripts for use in ChromeOS
- Crouton (singer), Jacob "Crouton" Olds, a singer in the band Family Force 5
- Crouton Records, a former record label started by Jon Mueller
- "Walter Crouton", a comic strip published by Seth MacFarlane
- Crouton, a planet featured in the show They Came from Outer Space

== See also ==
- Croton (disambiguation)
