= Open container =

Open container may refer to:

- The subject of open-container laws in the United States
- Open Container Initiative
- Open Container, an album by The Expendables
