= StorPool Storage =

Distributed storage software

StorPool
- Operating system: Linux
- Type: Distributed Storage
- License: Proprietary
- Website: storpool.com

StorPool Storage is a distributed storage software.

== History ==
StorPool was founded in November 2011 to develop storage software running on standard servers and replacing traditional storage arrays. The company is headquartered in Sofia, Bulgaria and has raised 2 funding rounds so far.

== Technology ==
StorPool pools direct attached storage (hard disks or SSDs) from standard servers to create a single pool of shared storage. The software is installed on each server in a cluster and combines the performance and capacity of the drives attached to the servers into one global namespace.

StorPool has no native Hyper-V or Windows support so far. For now it's not targeting the enterprise market for VMware either, to which StorPool is not natively compatible, though it can run in VMware "with performance degradation," says company CEO.

StorPool supports multitude Linux operating system distros. Supported virtualization technologies include KVM, LXC and any other technology compatible with the Linux storage stack.
