= Virtuozzo (company) =

Privately held software company

- Type: Privately held company
- Industry: Cloud computing
- Founded: 2015; 11 years ago
- Headquarters: Schaffhausen, Switzerland
- Products: Virtuozzo Infrastructure; Virtuozzo Application Management; Virtuozzo Storage; Virtuozzo Server; Virtuozzo Cloud
- Number of employees: 300 (2026)
- Subsidiaries: OnApp; Jelastic
- Website: virtuozzo.com

Virtuozzo is a software company that develops virtualization, cloud management and AI infrastructure software for cloud computing providers, managed services providers and internet hosting service providers. The company's software enables service providers to offer infrastructure as a service, container-as-a-service, platform as a service, Storage-as-as-service, kubernetes-as-a-service, WordPress-as-a-service and other solutions.

== History ==
The company was founded as SWsoft in 1997 as a privately held server automation and virtualization company. In 2000, the company released the first commercially available operating system-level virtualization container technology. In 2003, SWsoft acquired the makers of Confixx and Plesk web hosting products: Plesk Server Administration (PSA) control panel and Confixx Professional hosting software. Virtuozzo was the core enabling technology behind SWsoft's HSP Complete solution. In 2004, SWsoft acquired Parallels, Inc.

In 2005, the company open-sourced its operating system-level virtualization technology as OpenVZ. In 2007, SWsoft announced that it had changed its name to Parallels and would distribute its products under the Parallels name.

In December 2015, Virtuozzo was spun out from Parallels to become a standalone company. In May 2016, Virtuozzo announced its intention to join the Open Container Initiative.

In July 2021, Virtuozzo acquired OnApp. In October of that year, the company acquired Jelastic.

Kurt Daniel became Chief Executive Officer of Virtuozzo in late 2025, with the appointment publicly announced in February 2026.

In 2026, Virtuozzo announced its AI Infrastructure System, expanding its software portfolio to support AI infrastructure with integrated management of compute, GPU resources, storage, networking, and orchestration for AI, cloud, and virtualized workloads.

== List of products ==
- Virtuozzo Infrastructure is an OpenStack-based cloud management platform that enables service providers to sell public cloud, private cloud, hybrid cloud, Kubernetes-as-a-Service, Storage as a Service, Backup-as-a-Service, Disaster Recovery-as-a-Service and Desktop-as-a-Service.
- Virtuozzo Application Management enables service providers to sell Platform as a Service with integrated DevOps tools
- Virtuozzo Storage is a software-defined storage platform that enables service providers to sell block, file, and object storage services, backup storage, disaster recovery storage, and storage for cloud, virtualization, and AI workloads.
- Virtuozzo Server enables service providers to sell Virtual Private Servers, shared web hosting, container hosting and Storage as a Service.
- Virtuozzo Cloud is a fully managed, multi-tenant cloud platform operated by Virtuozzo that enables managed service providers to sell Infrastructure as a Service and Platform as a Service without owning or operating cloud infrastructure.

=== Open-source products ===
- OpenVZ is an operating-system-level virtualization technology for Linux
- VzLinux is a Linux distribution that is based on the source code of Red Hat Enterprise Linux (RHEL)
- CRIU is a software tool that is used to freeze and restore running Linux applications
- P.Haul - Python-based mechanism on top of CRIU, intended for live migration of containers and memory-touching processes inside.

Virtuozzo is a contributor to other open-source projects, including the Linux kernel, libvirt, KVM, Docker, QEMU, LXC, runc/libcontainer and Libct.

== Acquisitions ==
Number	Acquisition date	Company	Business	Country	Used as or integrated with	Ref.
1	August 2021	OnApp	OnApp Cloud Platform	United Kingdom	Cloud Platform for service providers, VMware cloud management portal, CDN platform	
2	October 2021	Jelastic	Jelastic Platform as a service	United States	Virtuozzo Application Platform, Virtuozzo Application Platform for WordPress	
