= Distrobox =

Application container for Linux

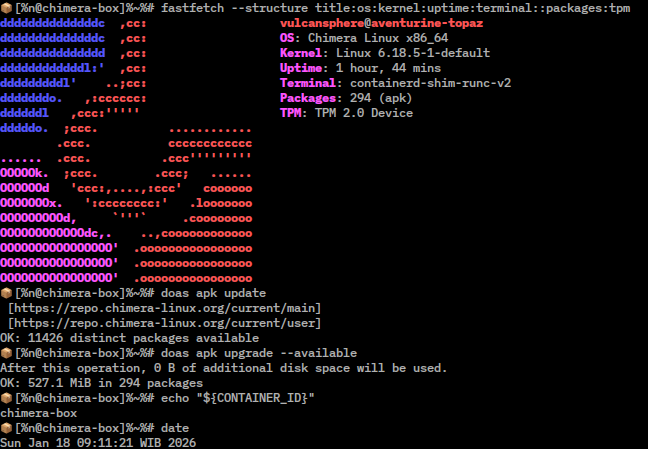
- Screenshot of Distrobox with Chimera Linux container
- Original author: Luca Di Maio
- Developer: Distrobox community
- Initial release: 2 December 2021; 4 years ago
- Stable release: 1.8.2.3 / 17 January 2026; 0 days ago
- Repository: github.com/89luca89/distrobox
- Written in: Shell language
- Operating system: Linux
- Type: OS-level virtualization
- License: GNU GPLv3
- Website: distrobox.it

Distrobox is an open source application container for Linux used to run software packaged for certain Linux distribution on another distribution. The application relies on container managers such as Docker, Podman, and Lilipod and act as wrapper for them. Distrobox is written in POSIX shell.

Software installed inside the container can be exported into the host machine for easier access. Distrobox can be used to run graphical software.

== History ==
The first public release of Distrobox was released in 2021.

Version 1.1.0 of Distrobox was released in December 2021, adding features and improvements such as ability to export containerised software into the host machine and better POSIX compatibility.

Version 1.3.0 of Distrobox was released in May 2022, adding more supported distributions and better integration with the host machine.

Version 1.8.2.0 of Distrobox was released in October 2025, adding enhancements for Bash completion.

== Design and security ==
Distrobox is designed for tight integration with the host machine, with isolation and sandbox being non-goals for the project. Proposed addition of sandboxed mode was discussed but Luca Di Maio decided against it.

== See also ==
- List of Linux containers
