= Apptainer =

Free, cross-platform and open-source computer program

- Other names: Singularity
- Original authors: Gregory Kurtzer (gmk), et al.
- Developer: Linux Foundation
- Release: 30 November 2021; 4 years ago
- Stable release: 1.5.5 / 22 October 2026; 31 days ago
- Written in: Go
- Operating system: Linux
- Type: OS-level virtualization
- License: 3-clause BSD License
- Website: apptainer.org
- Repository: github.com/apptainer/apptainer

Apptainer (formerly Singularity) is a free and open-source computer program that performs operating system-level virtualization also known as containerization.

One of the main uses of Apptainer is to bring containers and reproducibility to scientific computing and the high-performance computing (HPC) world.

The need for reproducibility requires the ability to use containers to move applications from system to system.

Using Apptainer containers, developers can work in reproducible environments of their choosing and design, and these complete environments can easily be copied and executed on other platforms.

In 2021, the company Sylabs forked the original Singularity project and released SingularityCE. Later that year the community of the Singularity open source project voted to rename itself to Apptainer and also came under the umbrella of the Linux Foundation. In October 2026 the SingularityCE project announced that it was shutting down.

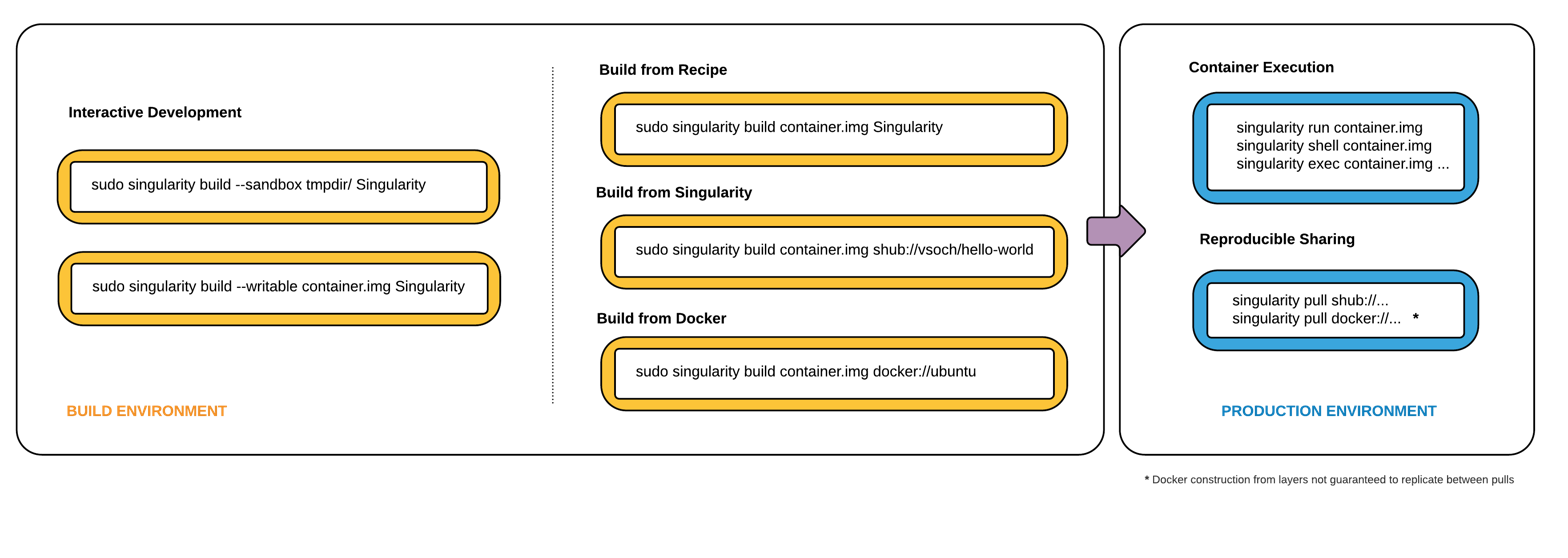
Usage workflow for Singularity containers

== History ==
Singularity

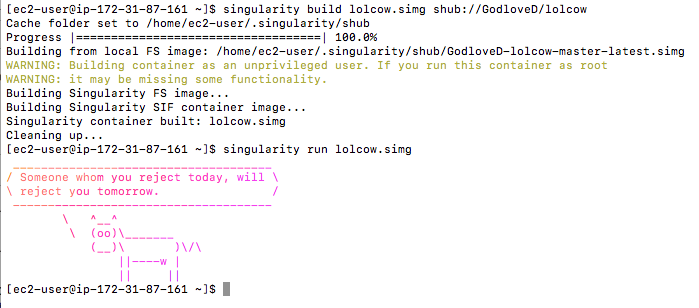
- Screenshot Singularity running a hello world container from the command line
- Other names: Apptainer
- Original authors: Gregory Kurtzer (gmk), et al.
- Developers: LBNL and HPCng
- Release: 2015; 11 years ago
- Final release: 3.8.7 / 17 March 2022; 4 years ago
- Written in: Go
- Operating system: Linux
- Type: OS-level virtualization
- License: 3-clause BSD License
- Website: web.archive.org/web/20211129101544/https://singularity.hpcng.org/
- Repository: github.com/apptainer/singularity

Apptainer began as the open-source project Singularity in 2015, when a team of researchers at Lawrence Berkeley National Laboratory, led by Gregory Kurtzer, developed the initial version written in the C programming language and released it under the BSD license.

By the end of 2016, many developers from different research facilities joined forces with the team at Lawrence Berkeley National Laboratory to further the development of Singularity.

Singularity quickly attracted the attention of computing-heavy scientific institutions worldwide:

- Stanford University Research Computing Center deployed Singularity on their XStream and Sherlock clusters
- National Institutes of Health installed Singularity on Biowulf, their 95,000+ core/30 PB Linux cluster
- Various sites of the Open Science Grid Consortium including Fermilab started adopting Singularity; by April 2017, Singularity was deployed on 60% of the Open Science Grid network.

For two years in a row, in 2016 and 2017, Singularity was recognized by HPCwire editors as "One of five new technologies to watch". In 2017 Singularity also won the first place for the category "Best HPC Programming Tool or Technology".

As of 2018, based on the data entered on a voluntary basis in a public registry, Singularity user base was estimated to be greater than 25,000 installations and included users at academic institutions such as Ohio State University and Michigan State University, as well as top HPC centers like Texas Advanced Computing Center, San Diego Supercomputer Center, and Oak Ridge National Laboratory.

In February 2018 the Sylabs company, founded by the Singularity author, was announced to provide commercial support for Singularity. In October of that year Sylabs released version 3.0.0 which was a rewrite in the Go programming language.

=== Apptainer / SingularityCE split ===
SingularityCE
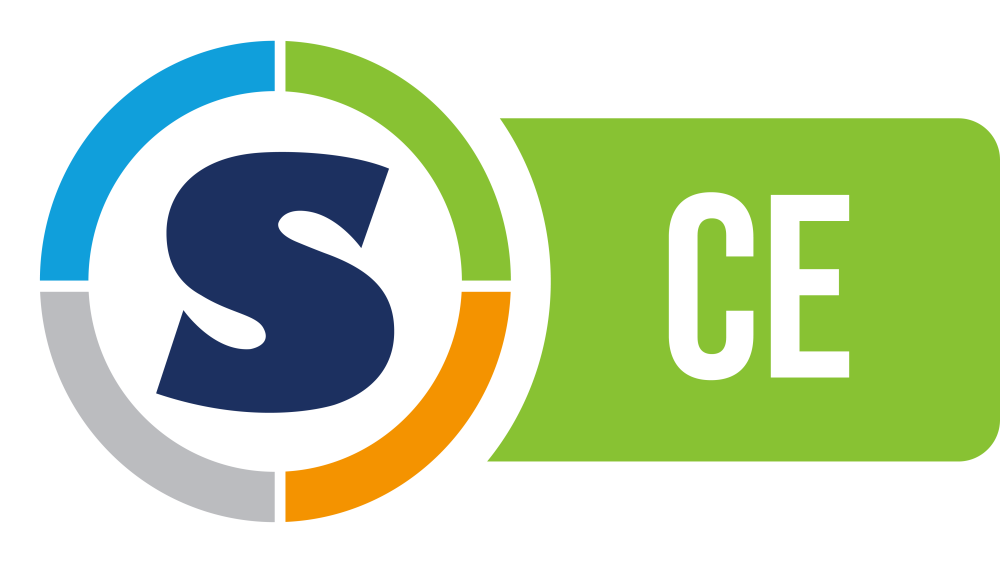
- Original authors: Gregory Kurtzer (gmk), et al.
- Developer: Sylabs
- Release: 4 May 2021; 5 years ago
- Final release: 4.6.0 / 5 October 2026; 48 days ago
- Written in: Go
- Operating system: Linux
- Type: OS-level virtualization
- License: 3-clause BSD License
- Website: sylabs.io/singularity/
- Repository: github.com/sylabs/singularity

In May 2020 Gregory Kurtzer left Sylabs but retained leadership of the Singularity open source project. In May 2021 Sylabs made a fork of the project and called it SingularityCE. In November 2021 the Singularity open source project joined the Linux Foundation and was renamed to Apptainer. In October 2026 the SingularityCE project shut down.

== Features ==
Apptainer is able to support natively high-performance interconnects, such as InfiniBand and Intel Omni-Path Architecture (OPA).

Similar to the support for InfiniBand and Intel OPA devices, Apptainer can support any PCIe-attached device within the compute node, such as graphic accelerators.

Apptainer also has native support for Open MPI library by utilizing a hybrid MPI container approach where OpenMPI exists both inside and outside the container.

These features make Apptainer increasingly useful in areas such as machine learning, deep learning and most data-intensive workloads where the applications benefit from the high bandwidth and low latency characteristics of these technologies.

== Integration ==
HPC systems traditionally already have resource management and job scheduling systems in place, so the container runtime environments must be integrated into the existing system resource manager.

Using other enterprise container solutions like Docker in HPC systems would require modifications to the software. Docker containers can be automatically converted to stand-alone Apptainer files which can then be submitted to HPC resource managers.

Apptainer seamlessly integrates with many resource managers including:

- HTCondor
- Oracle Grid Engine (SGE)
- SLURM (Simple Linux Utility for Resource Management)
- TORQUE (Terascale Open-source Resource and QUEue Manager)
- PBS Pro (PBS Professional)
- HashiCorp Nomad (A simple and flexible workload orchestrator)
- IBM Spectrum LSF

== See also ==
- Grid computing
- OverlayFS
- TOP500
