= Bazzite (operating system) =

- Developer: Universal Blue
- OS family: Linux (Unix-like)
- Working state: Current
- Source model: Open source
- Initial release: 17 August 2023
- Latest release: 44.20261006.1 / 7 October 2026
- Repository: github.com/ublue-os/bazzite
- Marketing target: Gaming, entertainment
- Package manager: ujust, rpm-ostree, Flatpak, Homebrew
- Kernel type: Monolithic (Linux kernel)
- Userland: GNU
- Default user interface: KDE Plasma, GNOME, Steam Gaming Mode
- License: Various
- Official website: bazzite.gg

Bazzite is a Linux distribution based on Fedora Linux, designed to be similar to Valve's SteamOS version 3.0. It is currently maintained by contributors of Universal Blue team. It provides a gaming-focused environment, and support for handheld PC devices, including the Steam Deck. Bazzite is named after the mineral of the same name, as Fedora Atomic Desktops historically had used a mineral naming scheme.

Bazzite offers three versions of the operating system, Desktop Edition for gaming desktops and laptops, Handheld Edition for handheld PCs and home theaters, and "Developer eXperience" edition for software developers. Being based on an Atomic Desktop variant of Fedora Linux, it utilizes containerization and package system such as Distrobox and Flatpak for software and package management, and image-based updates and rollbacks.

== History ==
Bazzite started in December 2022 as a personal project of Kyle Gospodnetich. Bazzite was, according to Gospodnetich “born out of my love for Linux and my love for gaming” and remained in its initial stages until early February 2023. The project was later brought into Universal Blue after Kyle was invited to join the organization. Since then Bazzite has been under Universal Blue with Kyle Gospodnetich as its approver and maintainer.

Then Bazzite 1.0 released back in August of 2023 as a custom image of Fedora 38, optimized for Linux gaming on PC and Steam Deck.

In early November 2023, Bazzite 2.0 released with Bazzite Portal, WayDroid, and Nix. There were bug fixes and drivers built-in for RGB, AMD GPUs, and Nintendo’s Gamecube controller support.

In April 2024, Bazzite 40 (based on Fedora 40) released with fastfetch, Ptyxis, and zoxide, as well as, Steam Deck OLED support, built-in CDEmu disc mounting and fan-curve controls for handhelds.

Then in October 2024, Bazzite 41 (based on Fedora 41) released with controller support of the MSI Claw, optimizations to Steam Gaming Mode, and audio patches.

Then in July 2025, Bazzite 42 (based on Fedora 42) released with Bazaar becoming the default application store for all images. Alongside Bazaar they revamped Bazzite Portal and added support for more handhelds and laptops

Then in October 2025 and April 2026 came out Bazzite 43 and Bazzite 44 respectively with the regular kernel, Fedora, and system updates. More handhelds were supported and a few features were removed like LatencyFleX and KDE Wallpaper Engine Plugin.

== Features ==
Bazzite 42 with the GNOME Desktop Environment

Bazzite provides a gaming-focused Linux experience with out-of-the-box support for platforms like Steam, Faugus (replacement of Lutris since 2026) , and the Heroic Games Launcher (Note: The Heroic Games Launcher adds support for the Epic Games Store, GOG, and Amazon Prime Gaming, which aren't officially supported on Linux.). It includes builds optimized for the Steam Deck and other handheld PCs, featuring controller support and hardware integration. Built on Fedora's rpm-ostree system, Bazzite uses an immutable design with atomic updates and rollback functionality. It supports both GNOME and KDE Plasma desktops. Hardware support includes preinstalled proprietary Nvidia drivers, the Mesa 3D stack, extra Wi-Fi drivers, and out-of-the-box support for HDR, VRR, and game controllers. Bazzite's software ecosystem combines multiple package managers, container systems, and custom applications developed by the Bazzite team. Package management is handled via Homebrew, rpm-ostree, and Flatpak, while containerized applications are supported through Waydroid, Distrobox, and Quadlet. Custom software includes Bazaar App Store, a Flatpak-based application store, and Bazzite Portal, a configuration tool used to enable features, install system updates, and manage system settings.

== Installation ==
As of latest Bazzite releases (44.20260902), a PC with at least 2 GHz quad-core processor, 8 GB of RAM, a graphics card that can utilize Vulkan 1.3 or higher, and 50 GB of free space in GPT-partitioned storage on a solid-state drive (SSDs) is recommended as a minimum system requirement. Only x86_64 architecture is officially supported.

Live images are the typical and the only official way for users to try and install Bazzite. They are provided by Bazzite on the website, where users can select the images with either KDE Plasma or GNOME, and whether to have preinstalled Nvidia drivers, and burnt to a DVD or USB Drive and then booted. Users can then use the Anaconda installer to install Bazzite on the hard drive.

== Editions ==
Bazzite is available in three main editions tailored for different devices and use cases.

=== Desktop Edition ===
Bazzite Desktop Edition is the main edition of the operating system. It is specifically focused for desktops and laptops with a focus on gaming with preinstalled utilities such as Steam.

=== Handheld Edition (Bazzite-Deck) ===
Bazzite-Deck is designed for handheld PCs and Home Theater PC setups. Similar to the experience offered from SteamOS for the Steam Deck, Bazzite-Deck boots into the Gaming Mode interface for handheld devices.. It shares many packages that SteamOS includes, so that after installation is finished, it is ready for gaming.

=== Developer Experience (Bazzite-DX) ===
Bazzite Developer Experience (stylized as "Developer eXperience") targets software developers. This edition is installed by using its rebasing feature to rebase the current Bazzite installation. It comes preinstalled with Docker, Visual Studio Code, and container-centric terminal emulator.

== Development ==
Bazzite was built by Kyle Gospodnetich in 2023 as a personal project. Later on he merged the project with Universal Blue. The project is focused on creating custom, immutable operating system images based on the Fedora Atomic Desktops which are GNOME and KDE Plasma. It aims to be “ready-to-use” delivering pre-installed applications such as Steam and Lutris, as well as system drivers and custom tweaks directly into the base system image when it is installed.

Bazzite relies on containerization to maintain its immutable design. Therefore, it lessens the risk of tampering with the core system and enables atomic rollbacks if the user wants to revert to a stable state of the operating system. Bazzite utilizes rpm-ostree for image-based updates and atomic rollbacks, alongside Distrobox and Flatpak for package management.

== Community ==
Since its initial release, Bazzite has garnered a following because of its design on creating the best gaming OS. Many users agree that Bazzite is a viable operating system because it contains less or no bloatware and its gaming performance matches that of Windows. Eurogamer said: "Bazzite provides a great SteamOS-like experience for Windows handheld users." Most gaming handhelds use Windows or SteamOS, but Bazzite is a feasible alternative because of its immutable design preventing users from ruining their operating system and its console-like experience.

As of late September 2026, nearly 100 thousand people are actively using the different editions of Bazzite and is still rising

Bazzite has official accounts in Reddit, X (Twitter), BlueSky, Lemmy, and in Discord. There is a Universal Blue forum where announcements and updates are posted.

== Releases ==
The official 1.0.0 release of Bazzite was made available in 2023. Ever since the Bazzite team has steadily released several versions supporting the desktop and handheld versions.

In August 2024, Bazzite 3.7.0 was the last version released with a version number, changing the version numbering scheme to match upstream Fedora version starting from Bazzite 41 in April 2025.

Version	Release Date	Kernel	GNOME	KDE Plasma
45	03 / 11 / 2026	7.2.15-ogc1.1	51	6.8.2
44	02 / 09 / 2026	6.19 OGC (desktop) / 7.2 OGC (Deck/ Handheld)	50	6.6
43	20 / 04 / 2026	7.2.3-ogc3.1	49	6.5
42	19 / 10 / 2025	6.13.9-103	48	6.3.4
41	09 / 04 / 2025	6.11.x	47	6.2
40 (3.7.0)	28 / 08 / 2024	6.9.x	46	6.1
40 (3.0.0)	24 / 04 / 2024	6.8.x	46	6.0
2.3.0	23 / 02 / 2024	6.7.x	45	5.27
2.0.2	08 / 11 / 2023	6.5.x	45	5.27
1.3.0	12 / 10 / 2023	6.4.x	44	5.27
1.0.0	17 / 08 / 2023	6.4.x	44	5.27
