= OS-level virtualization =

Operating system virtualization paradigm

OS-level virtualization is an operating system (OS) virtualization paradigm in which the kernel allows the existence of multiple isolated user space instances, including containers (LXC, Solaris Containers, AIX WPARs, HP-UX SRP Containers, Docker, Podman, Guix), zones (Solaris Containers), virtual private servers (OpenVZ), partitions, virtual environments (VEs), virtual kernels (DragonFly BSD), and jails (FreeBSD jail and chroot). Such instances may look like real computers from the point of view of programs running in them. A computer program running on an ordinary operating system can see all resources (connected devices, files and folders, network shares, CPU power, quantifiable hardware capabilities) of that computer. Programs running inside a container can only see the container's contents and devices assigned to the container.

On Unix-like operating systems, this feature can be seen as an advanced implementation of the standard chroot mechanism, which changes the apparent root folder for the current running process and its children. In addition to isolation mechanisms, the kernel often provides resource-management features to limit the impact of one container's activities on other containers. Linux containers are all based on the virtualization, isolation, and resource management mechanisms provided by the Linux kernel, notably Linux namespaces and cgroups.

Although the word container most commonly refers to OS-level virtualization, it is sometimes used to refer to fuller virtual machines operating in varying degrees of concert with the host OS, such as Microsoft's Hyper-V containers. For an overview of virtualization since 1960, see Timeline of virtualization technologies.

== Operation ==
On ordinary operating systems for personal computers, a computer program can see (even though it might not be able to access) all the system's resources. They include:

- Hardware capabilities that can be employed, such as the CPU and the network connection
- Data that can be read or written, such as files, folders and network shares
- Connected peripherals it can interact with, such as webcam, printer, scanner, or fax

The operating system may allow or deny access to such resources based on which program requests them and the user account in the context in which it runs. The operating system may also hide those resources, so that when the computer program enumerates them, they do not appear in the enumeration results. Nevertheless, from a programming point of view, the computer program has interacted with those resources and the operating system has managed an act of interaction.

With operating-system-virtualization, or containerization, it is possible to run programs within containers, to which only parts of these resources are allocated. A program expecting to see the whole computer, once run inside a container, can only see the allocated resources and believes them to be all that is available. Several containers can be created on each operating system, to each of which a subset of the computer's resources is allocated. Each container may contain any number of computer programs. These programs may run concurrently or separately, and may even interact with one another.

Containerization has similarities to application virtualization: In the latter, only one computer program is placed in an isolated container and the isolation applies to file system only.

== Uses ==
Operating-system level virtualization is commonly used in virtual hosting environments, where it is useful for securely allocating finite hardware resources among a large number of mutually-distrusting users. System administrators may also use it for consolidating server hardware by moving services on separate hosts into containers on the one server.

Operating-system level virtualization can also be used to run software created for a certain Linux distribution on another distribution, an example is Distrobox.

Other typical scenarios include separating several programs to separate containers for improved security, hardware independence, and added resource management features. The improved security provided by the use of a chroot mechanism, however, is not perfect. Operating-system-level virtualization implementations capable of live migration can also be used for dynamic load balancing of containers between nodes in a cluster.

=== Overhead ===
Operating-system level virtualization usually imposes less overhead than full virtualization because programs in OS-level virtual partitions use the operating system's normal system call interface and do not need to be subjected to emulation or be run in an intermediate virtual machine, as is the case with full virtualization (such as VMware ESXi, QEMU, or Hyper-V) and paravirtualization (such as Xen or User-mode Linux). This form of virtualization also does not require hardware support for efficient performance.

=== Flexibility ===
Operating-system level virtualization is not as flexible as other virtualization approaches since it cannot host a guest operating system different from the host one, or a different guest kernel. For example, with Linux, different distributions are fine, but other operating systems such as Windows cannot be hosted. Operating systems using variable input systematics are subject to limitations within the virtualized architecture. Adaptation methods including cloud-server relay analytics maintain the OS-level virtual environment within these applications.

Solaris partially overcomes the limitation described above with its branded zones feature, which provides the ability to run an environment within a container that emulates an older Solaris 8 or 9 version in a Solaris 10 host. Linux branded zones (referred to as "lx" branded zones) are also available on x86-based Solaris systems, providing a complete Linux user space and support for the execution of Linux applications; additionally, Solaris provides utilities needed to install Red Hat Enterprise Linux 3.x or CentOS 3.x Linux distributions inside "lx" zones. However, in 2010 Linux branded zones were removed from Solaris; in 2014 they were reintroduced in Illumos, which is the open source Solaris fork, supporting 32-bit Linux kernels.

=== Storage ===
Some implementations provide file-level copy-on-write (CoW) mechanisms. (Most commonly, a standard file system is shared between partitions, and those partitions that change the files automatically create their own copies.) This is easier to back up, more space-efficient and simpler to cache than the block-level copy-on-write schemes common on whole-system virtualizers. Whole-system virtualizers, however, can work with non-native file systems and create and roll back snapshots of the entire system state.

== Implementations ==
=== Actively Maintained / Developed Implementations ===
Mechanism	Operating system	License	Start of development	Features									
Mechanism	Operating system	License	Start of development	File system isolation	Copy on write	Disk quotas	I/O rate limiting	Memory limits	CPU quotas	Network isolation	Nested virtualization	Partition checkpointing and live migration	Root privilege isolation
chroot	Most UNIX-like operating systems	Varies by operating system	1982	Partial (Note: Root user can easily escape from chroot. Chroot was never supposed to be used as a security mechanism.)	No	No	No	No	No	No	Yes	No	No
Docker	Linux, Windows x64 macOS	Apache License 2.0	2013	Yes	Yes	Partial (Note: For btrfs, overlay2, windowsfilter, and zfs storage drivers.)	Yes (since 1.10)	Yes	Yes	Yes	Yes	Only in experimental mode with CRIU	Yes (since 1.10)
Podman	Linux, Windows, macOS, FreeBSD	Apache License 2.0	2018	Yes	Yes	Yes	Yes	Yes	Yes	Yes	Yes	Yes	Yes
LXC	Linux	GNU GPLv2	2008	Yes	Yes	Partial (Note: Disk quotas per container are possible when using separate partitions for each container with the help of LVM, or when the underlying host filesystem is btrfs, in which case btrfs subvolumes are automatically used.)	Partial (Note: I/O rate limiting is supported when using Btrfs.)	Yes	Yes	Yes	Yes	Yes	Yes
Apptainer (fork of Singularity)	Linux	BSD Licence	2015	Yes	Yes	Yes	No	No	No	No	No	No	Yes
OpenVZ	Linux	GNU GPLv2	2005	Yes	Yes	Yes	Yes (Note: Available since Linux kernel 2.6.18-028stable021. Implementation is based on CFQ disk I/O scheduler, but it is a two-level schema, so I/O priority is not per-process, but rather per-container.)	Yes	Yes	Yes (Note: Each container can have its own IP addresses, firewall rules, routing tables and so on. Three different networking schemes are possible: route-based, bridge-based, and assigning a real network device (NIC) to a container.)	Partial (Note: Docker containers can run inside OpenVZ containers.)	Yes	Yes (Note: Each container may have root access without possibly affecting other containers.)
Virtuozzo	Linux, Windows	Trialware	2000	Yes	Yes	Yes	Yes (Note: Available since version 4.0, January 2008.)	Yes	Yes	Yes	Partial (Note: Docker containers can run inside Virtuozzo containers.)	Yes	Yes
Solaris Containers (Zones)	illumos (OpenSolaris), Solaris	CDDL, Proprietary	2004	Yes	Yes (ZFS)	Yes	Partial (Note: Yes with illumos)	Yes	Yes	Yes (Note: See Solaris network virtualization and resource control for more details.)	Partial (Note: Only when top level is a KVM zone (illumos) or a kz zone (Oracle).)	Partial (Note: Starting in Solaris 11.3 Beta, Solaris Kernel Zones may use live migration.) (Note: Cold migration (shutdown-move-restart) is implemented.)	Yes (Note: Non-global zones are restricted so they may not affect other zones via a capability-limiting approach. The global zone may administer the non-global zones.)
FreeBSD jail	FreeBSD, DragonFly BSD	BSD License	2000	Yes	Yes (ZFS)	Yes (Note: Check the "allow.quotas" option and the "Jails and file systems" section on the FreeBSD jail man page for details.)	Yes	Yes	Yes	Yes	Yes	Partial	Yes
vkernel	DragonFly BSD	BSD Licence	2006	Yes	Yes	—N/a	?	Yes	Yes	Yes	?	?	Yes
WPARs	AIX	Commercial proprietary software	2007	Yes	No	Yes	Yes	Yes	Yes	Yes (Note: Available since TL 02.)	No	Yes	?
iCore Virtual Accounts	Windows XP	Freeware	2008	Yes	No	Yes	No	No	No	No	?	No	?
Sandboxie	Windows	GNU GPLv3	2004	Yes	Yes	Partial	No	No	No	Partial	No	No	Yes
systemd-nspawn	Linux	GNU LGPLv2.1+	2010	Yes	Yes	Yes	Yes	Yes	Yes	Yes	Yes (Note: For KVM, parent container requires rw access to /dev/kvm.)	?	Yes
Turbo	Windows	Freemium	2012	Yes	No	No	No	No	No	Yes	No	No	Yes

=== Historical/Defunct Implementations ===
Mechanism	Operating system	License	Actively developed since or between	Features									
Mechanism	Operating system	License	Actively developed since or between	File system isolation	Copy on write	Disk quotas	I/O rate limiting	Memory limits	CPU quotas	Network isolation	Nested virtualization	Partition checkpointing and live migration	Root privilege isolation
Linux-VServer (security context)	Linux, Windows Server 2016	GNU GPLv2	2001-2018	Yes	Yes	Yes	Yes (Note: Using the CFQ scheduler, there is a separate queue per guest.)	Yes	Yes	Partial (Note: Networking is based on isolation, not virtualization.)	?	No	Partial (Note: A total of 14 user capabilities are considered safe within a container. The rest may cannot be granted to processes within that container without allowing that process to potentially interfere with things outside that container.)
lmctfy	Linux	Apache License 2.0	2013–2015	Yes	Yes	Yes	Yes	Yes	Yes	Partial	?	No	Partial
sysjail	OpenBSD, NetBSD	BSD License	2006–2009	Yes	No	No	No	No	No	Yes	No	No	?
rkt (rocket)	Linux	Apache License 2.0	2014–2018	Yes	Yes	Yes	Yes	Yes	Yes	Yes	?	?	Yes

== See also ==
- Container orchestration
- Linux cgroups
- Linux namespaces
- Hypervisor
- Open Container Initiative
- Serverless computing
- Storage hypervisor
- Virtual resource partitioning
