= Workload Partitions =

OS-level virtualisation

IBM AIX Workload Partitions (WPARs) are a software implementation of operating system-level virtualization introduced in the IBM AIX 6.1 operating system that provides application environment isolation and resource control.

WPARs are software partitions that are created from, and share the resources of, a single instance of the AIX OS. WPARs can be created on any IBM Power Systems or IBM System p hardware that supports AIX version 6.1 and higher . There are three kinds of WPARs: System WPARs; Application WPARs; and Versioned WPARs.

== System WPAR ==
A system WPAR behaves as a complete installation of AIX.

== Application WPAR ==
Application WPARs are lightweight environments used for isolating and executing a single application process.

== Versioned WPAR ==
A WPAR which contains an instance of either AIX 5.2 or AIX 5.3. Versioned WPARs are only supported in AIX 7.1 and later LPARs.

== Mobility ==
WPAR mobility is an extension to WPARs that provides the ability to move a running workload from one physical machine to another. Both System and Application WPARs can be moved from one machine to another. To continue having access to the same files before/after mobility; the filesystems of a mobile WPAR must either be stored in a disk or NFS mounted (both of which should be shared and accessible from all the machines where WPAR is being moved to). The feature can be helpful in the following scenarios :

- During hardware upgrades or other planned outages.
- To transfer the load of the running application to another machine.

== See also ==
- Operating system-level virtualization
- Logical Partitioning (LPAR)
- Dynamic Logical Partitioning (DLPAR)
- FreeBSD jail
- Solaris Containers
- OpenVZ
- Linux-VServer
