= Crouton (computing) =

Crouton (ChromiumOS Universal Chroot Environment) is a set of scripts which allows Ubuntu, Debian, and Kali Linux systems to run parallel to a ChromeOS system. Crouton works by using a chroot instead of dual-booting to allow a user to run desktop environments at the same time: ChromeOS and another environment of the user's choice.

In Google I/O 2019, Google announced all Chromebooks shipped that year onward will be Linux compatible out of the box.

== Usage ==
Crouton requires the user to switch their ChromeOS device to Developer Mode. This requires a full "Powerwash" of the device and enabled the use of special commands in the Crosh terminal. Despite having many Linux distributions to choose from, none are officially supported by their developers. While Crostini has become an officially supported way to run Linux applications, many people still prefer Crouton due to the fact it allows the user to access a desktop environment.

== End of life ==
On March 29, 2025, crouton went End Of Life. The reason is because of a lot of changes in ChromeOS that are affecting Crouton.
