= Comparison of platform virtualization software =

Platform virtualization software, specifically emulators and hypervisors, are software packages that emulate the whole physical computer machine, often providing multiple virtual machines on one physical platform. The table below compares basic information about platform virtualization hypervisors.

== General ==
Name	Creator	Host CPU	Guest CPU	Host OS	Guest OS	License
86Box	Miran Grča	x86, x86-64, ARMv7, AArch64	x86 (Intel 8086 to Pentium II and compatible)	Windows, Linux, macOS	Windows, Linux, DOS, BSD, OS/2, Haiku	GPL version 3
bhyve	FreeBSD	x86-64	x86, x86-64	FreeBSD, Illumos	FreeBSD, FreeNAS, pfSense, OpenBSD, Linux, Windows, Illumos	BSD
Bochs	Kevin J. Lawton	Any	x86, x86-64	Windows, Linux, FreeBSD, Unix/X11, Mac OS 9, macOS, BeOS, MorphOS, OS/2	Windows, Linux, DOS, BSD, OS/2, Haiku	LGPL
Containers, or Zones	Sun Microsystems	x86, x86-64, SPARC (portable: not tied to hardware)	Same as host	Solaris 10, Solaris 11, OpenSolaris 2009.06, illumos distributions	Solaris (8, 9, 10, 11), illumos, Linux (BrandZ)	CDDL
Cooperative Linux (coLinux)	Dan Aloni, other developers	x86	Same as host	Windows 2000, XP, 2003, Vista	Linux	GPL version 2
CHARON	Stromasys	x86, x86-64	PDP-11, VAX, Alpha, HP 3000, Sparc	Windows, Linux	VMS, OpenVMS, Tru64 UNIX, MPE/iX, RSX-11, RT11, RSTS, Solaris, SunOS	Proprietary
Denali	University of Washington	x86	x86	Denali	Ilwaco, NetBSD	Not distributed
DOSBox	Peter Veenstra, Sjoerd with community	Any	x86	Linux, Windows, classic Mac OS, macOS, BeOS, FreeBSD, NetBSD, OpenBSD, Solaris, QNX, IRIX, MorphOS, AmigaOS, Maemo, Symbian	Internally emulated MS-DOS shell; self-booting disks, unofficially Windows 1.0 to 98	GPL
DOSEMU	Community project	x86, x86-64	x86	Linux	DOS	GPL version 2
FreeBSD Jail	Poul-Henning Kamp / FreeBSD	Any running FreeBSD or DragonFly BSD	Same as host	FreeBSD, DragonFly BSD	same as host (shared *BSD kernel), plus Linux ABI through compat layer	BSD
GXemul	Anders Gavare	Any	ARM, MIPS, Motorola 88000, PowerPC, SuperH	Unix-like	NetBSD, OpenBSD, Linux, Ultrix, Sprite	BSD
Hercules	Roger Bowler	Any	z/Architecture	Windows, FreeBSD, NetBSD, Linux, macOS	Linux on IBM Z, z/OS, z/VM, z/VSE, OS/360, DOS/360, DOS/VS, MVS, VM/370, TSS/370	QPL
Hyper-V (2008)	Microsoft	x86-64 with Intel VT-x or AMD-V	x86-64, x86 (up to 8 physical CPUs)	Windows Server 2008 (R2) w/Hyper-V role, Microsoft Hyper-V Server	Supported drivers for Windows 2000, Windows 2003, Windows 2008, Windows XP, Windows Vista, FreeBSD, Linux (SUSE 10 released, more announced)	Proprietary
Hyper-V (2012+)	Microsoft	x86-64 with Intel VT-x or AMD-V, ARMv8	x86-64, (up to 64 physical CPUs), ARMv8	Windows 8, 8.1, 10, and Windows Server 2012 (R2) w/Hyper-V role, Microsoft Hyper-V Server	Supported drivers for Windows NT, FreeBSD, Linux (SUSE 10, RHEL 6, CentOS 6)	Proprietary. Component of various Windows editions.
INTEGRITY	Green Hills Software	x86, ARM, PowerPC	Same as host	Linux, Windows	INTEGRITY native, Linux, Android, AUTOSAR, Windows (on some platforms)	Proprietary
Integrity Virtual Machines	Hewlett-Packard	IA-64	IA-64	HP-UX	HP-UX, Windows, Linux (OpenVMS announced)	Proprietary
JPC (Virtual Machine)	University of Oxford	Any running the Java Virtual Machine	x86	Java Virtual Machine	DOS, Linux, Windows up to 3.0	GPL version 2
KVM	Qumranet, now Red Hat	x86, x86-64, IA-64, with x86 virtualization, s390, PowerPC, ARM	Same as host	Linux, illumos	FreeBSD, Linux, Solaris, Windows, Plan 9	GPL version 2
Linux-VServer	Community project	x86, x86-64, IA-64, Alpha, PowerPC 64, PA-RISC 64, SPARC64, ARM, S/390, SH/66, MIPS	Compatible	Linux	Linux variants	GPL version 2
LynxSecure	LynuxWorks	x86	x86	No host OS	LynxOS, Linux, Windows	Proprietary
LXC	Community project, Canonical Ltd.	x86, x86-64, IA-64, PowerPC 64, SPARC64, Itanium, ARM	Same as host	Linux	Linux variants	GPL version 2
OKL4 Microvisor	Open Kernel Labs, acquired by General Dynamics Corporation	x86, ARM, MIPS	ARM (v5, v6, v7, v8; paravirtualization), ARMv7VE (hardware virtualization)	No host OS	Various OSes and RTOSes including Linux, Android, QNX	Proprietary
OpenNebula	Open source project managed by OpenNebula Systems	x86, x86-64, ARM	x86, x86-64, ARM, nVidia	No host OS	Windows, Linux (various flavors)	Apache 2.0
OpenVZ	Community project, supported by SWsoft, now Parallels, Inc.	x86, x86-64, IA-64, PowerPC 64, SPARC64	Same as host	Linux	same as host (shared Linux kernel), choice of userland distribution	GPL
Oracle VM Server for x86	Oracle Corporation	x86, x86-64	x86, x86-64	No host OS	Windows, Oracle Linux, Red Hat Enterprise Linux, Solaris	GPLv2, Oracle VM Server; Manager is proprietary
OVPsim	OVP	x86	OR1K, MIPS32, ARC600/700, ARM; and public API which enables users to write custom processor models, RISC, CISC, DSP, VLIW all possible	Windows, Linux	Depends on target machine, for example includes MIPS Malta that runs Linux or SMP-Linux; and includes public API which enables users to write custom peripheral and system models	Proprietary, Apache 2.0 for models
Parallels Desktop for Mac	Parallels, Inc.	x86	x86, x86-64, aarch64	macOS	DOS, Windows, Linux, macOS, FreeBSD, OS/2, eComStation, Solaris, Haiku	Proprietary
Parallels Workstation (discontinued 2013)	Parallels, Inc.	x86	x86	Windows, Linux	Windows, Linux, FreeBSD, OS/2, eComStation, DOS, Solaris, Haiku	Proprietary
PearPC	Sebastian Biallas	x86, x86-64, PowerPC	PowerPC	Windows, Linux, OS X, FreeBSD, NetBSD	Mac OS X, Darwin, Linux	GPL
PikeOS	SYSGO	x86, PowerPC, ARM, MIPS, SPARC, RISC-V	Same as host	No host OS, Linux or Windows as dev. hosts	PikeOS native, Linux, ELinOS, Windows, POSIX, AUTOSAR, Android, RTEMS, OSEK, ARINC 653 APEX, ITRON	Proprietary
Proxmox VE	Proxmox	x86-64	x86, x86-64	Linux (Debian based)	Windows, Linux, Linux variants, Solaris, FreeBSD, OSx86 (as FreeBSD), virtual appliances, Netware, OS/2, SCO, BeOS, Haiku, Darwin	AGPLv3
Oracle VM Server for SPARC (LDoms)	Oracle Corporation	UltraSPARC T1, UltraSPARC T2, UltraSPARC T2+, SPARC T3, SPARC T4	Compatible	Solaris 10, Solaris 11	Oracle support: Solaris; unsupported: Linux, FreeBSD	Proprietary
PowerVM	IBM	POWER4, POWER5, POWER6, POWER7, POWER8, POWER9, Power10	POWER4/5/6/7/8/9/Power10, x86 (PowerVM-Lx86)	No host OS, PowerVM Firmware	Linux PowerPC, x86; AIX, IBM i	Proprietary
QEMU	Fabrice Bellard, other developers	x86, x86-64, IA-64, PowerPC, SPARC 32/64, ARM, S/390, MIPS	x86, x86-64, Alpha, ARM, CRIS, LM32, M68k, MicroBlaze, MIPS, OpenRisc32, PowerPC, S/390, SH4, SPARC 32/64, Unicore32, Xtensa	Windows ("experimental"), Linux, macOS, Solaris, FreeBSD, OpenBSD, BeOS	Changes regularly	GPL/LGPL
QEMU w/ kqemu module	Fabrice Bellard	x86, x86-64	Same as host	Linux, FreeBSD, OpenBSD, Solaris, Windows	Changes regularly	GPL/LGPL
QEMU w/ qvm86 module	Paul Brook	x86	x86	Linux, NetBSD, Windows	Changes regularly	GPL
QuickTransit	Transitive Corp.	x86, x86-64, IA-64, POWER	MIPS, PowerPC, SPARC, x86	Linux, OS X, Solaris	Linux, OS X, Irix, Solaris	Proprietary
RTS Hypervisor	Real-Time Systems GmbH	x86, x86-64	x86, x86-64	No host OS	Windows, Linux, Windows Embedded, QNX, RTOS-32, VxWorks, OS-9, T-Kernel	Proprietary
SIMH	Bob Supnik, The Computer History Simulation Project	x86, x86-64, Alpha, ARM, HPPA, IA-64, M68K, MIPS, MIPSel, POWER, s390, SPARC	Data General Nova, Eclipse; Digital Equipment Corporation PDP-1, PDP-4, PDP-7, PDP-8, PDP-9, PDP-10, PDP-11, PDP-15, VAX; GRI Corporation GRI-909; IBM 1401, 1620, 1130, 7090/7094, System/3; Interdata (Perkin-Elmer) 16b/32b systems; Hewlett-Packard 2114, 2115, 2116, 2100, 21MX; Honeywell H316/H516; MITS Altair 8800 with 8080 and Z80; Royal McBee LGP-30, LGP-21; Scientific Data Systems SDS 940	BSD, Linux, Solaris, VMS, Windows	Depends on target machine, includes NetBSD/VAX, OpenBSD/VAX, VAX/VMS, Unix v6, Unix v7, TOPS-10, TOPS-20, ITS	BSD-like, unique
Simics	Virtutech, acquired by Intel	x86, x86-64	8051, 68000, ARM (v4, v5, v6, v7), MIPS32, MIPS64, Cavium cnMIPS, Broadcom XLR MIPS, Freescale (e300, e500, e600, e5500, e6500), IBM (POWER, PPC44x, PPC46x, 47x), SPARC v8 (LEON), SPARC v9 (UltraSparc), x86 (from 80286 to Sandy Bridge), x86-64 (from Pentium4 to Sandy Bridge), TI TMS320C64xx, Renesas H8, Renesas SH	Windows 32-bit and 64-bit, Linux 32-bit and 64-bit	Depends on target machine, typically runs unmodified software stacks from the corresponding real target, including VxWorks, VxWorks 653, OSE, QNX, Linux, Solaris, Windows, FreeBSD, RTEMS, TinyOS, Wind River Hypervisor, VMware ESX, and others	Proprietary
Sun xVM Server	Sun Microsystems	x86-64, SPARC	Same as host	No host OS	Windows XP, 2003 Server (x86-64 only), Linux, Solaris	GPL version 3
SVISTA 2004	Serenity Systems International	x86	x86	Windows, OS/2, Linux	Windows, Linux, OS/2, BSD	Proprietary
TRANGO	TRANGO Virtual Processors, Grenoble, France	ARM, XScale, MIPS, PowerPC	Paravirtualized ARM, MIPS, PowerPC	No host OS, Linux or Windows as dev. hosts	Linux, eCos, μC/OS-II, WindowsCE, Nucleus, VxWorks	Proprietary
User Mode Linux	Jeff Dike, other developers	x86, x86-64, PowerPC	Same as host	Linux	Linux	GPL version 2
VirtualBox	Innotek, acquired by Oracle Corporation	x86, x86-64, ARMv8	x86, x86-64 (with Intel VT-x or AMD-V, and VirtualBox 2 or later), ARMv8 (from 7.1 on macOS, 7.2 on Windows)	Windows, Linux, macOS, Solaris, FreeBSD, eComStation	DOS, Linux, macOS, FreeBSD, Haiku, OS/2, Solaris, Syllable, Windows, and OpenBSD (with Intel VT-x or AMD-V, due to otherwise tolerated incompatibilities in the emulated memory management), OpenVMS/x86-64.	GPL version 2; full version with extra enterprise features is proprietary
Virtual Iron 3.1	Virtual Iron Software, Inc., acquired by Oracle	x86 VT-x, x86-64 AMD-V	x86, x86-64	No host OS	Windows, Linux	Proprietary, some components GPLv2
Virtual Machine Manager	Red Hat	x86, x86-64	x86, x86-64	Linux	Linux, Windows	GPL version 2
Virtual PC 2007 (discontinued)	Connectix and Microsoft	x86, x86-64	x86	Windows Vista (Business, Enterprise, Ultimate), XP Pro, XP Tablet PC Edition	DOS, Windows, OS/2, Linux (SUSE, Xubuntu), OpenSolaris (Belenix)	Proprietary
Windows Virtual PC (discontinued)	Connectix and Microsoft	x86, x86-64 with Intel VT-x or AMD-V	x86	Windows 7	Windows XP, Windows Vista, Windows 7, Windows Server 2003, Windows Server 2008	Proprietary
Virtual PC 7 for Mac	Connectix and Microsoft	PowerPC	x86	Mac OS X	Windows, OS/2, Linux	Proprietary
VirtualLogix VLX	VirtualLogix	x86, ARM, TI DSP C6000, PowerPC	Same as host	No host OS	Linux, Windows XP, C5, VxWorks, Nucleus, DSP/BIOS, proprietary	Proprietary
Virtual Server 2005 R2	Connectix and Microsoft	x86, x86-64	x86, x86-64	Windows Server 2003, 2008, XP (Requires IIS)	Windows NT, 2000, 2003, 2008, Linux (Red Hat, SUSE, Ubuntu)	Proprietary
Synopsys (CoWare) Virtual Platform	CoWare	x86, x86-64, SPARC v9	Devices including (multi) cores from ARM, MIPS, PowerPC, Toshiba MeP, Renesas SH, Texas Instruments, Tensilica, ZSP	Windows, Linux, Solaris	Depends on guest CPU; includes: Linux (various flavors), μITRON (various flavors), Windows CE, Symbian, more	Proprietary
Virtuozzo	SWsoft, now Virtuozzo Inc	x86, IA-64, x86-64	same as host	Linux	same as host (shared Linux kernel)	Proprietary
vkernel	Matthew Dillon / DragonFly BSD	x86-64	same as host	DragonFly BSD	any compatible vkernel binary of DragonFly	BSD
VMM	OpenBSD	x86-64	x86, x86-64	OpenBSD	OpenBSD and Linux guests	BSD
VMware ESX Server	VMware	x86, x86-64	x86, x86-64	No host OS	Windows, Linux, Solaris, FreeBSD, OSx86 (as FreeBSD), virtual appliances, Netware, OS/2, SCO, BeOS, Haiku, Darwin, others: runs arbitrary OS (Note: Can run a guest OS without modifying it, and hence is generally able to run any OS that could run on a physical machine the VM simulates.)	Proprietary
VMware ESXi	VMware	x86, x86-64	x86, x86-64	No host OS	Same as VMware ESX Server	Proprietary
VMware Fusion	VMware	x86, x86-64	x86, x86-64	macOS	Same as VMware ESX Server	Proprietary
VMware Server	VMware	x86, x86-64	x86, x86-64	Windows, Linux	Same as VMware ESX Server	Proprietary
VMware Workstation	VMware	x86-64 (Note: Older versions of VMware Workstation support x86.)	x86, x86-64	Windows, Linux	Same as VMware ESX Server	Proprietary
VMware Player, later VMware Workstation Player	VMware	x86-64 (Note: Older versions of VMware Player/VMware Workstation Player support x86.)	x86, x86-64	Windows, Linux	Same as VMware ESX Server	Proprietary, free for personal non-commercial use
Wind River Hypervisor	Wind River	x86, x86-64, PowerPC, ARM	Same as host	No host OS	Linux, VxWorks, unmodified guests (including MS Windows and RTOSes such ach OSE, QNX and others), bare metal virtual board	Proprietary
Xen	Xensource, Now Citrix Systems	x86, x86-64, ARM, IA-64 (inactive), PowerPC (inactive)	Same as host	Linux, Unix-like	Linux, FreeBSD, MiniOS, NetBSD, Solaris, Windows 7/XP/Vista/Server 2008 (requires Intel VT-x (Vanderpool) or AMD-V (Pacifica)-capable CPU), Plan 9	GNU GPLv2 +
XCP-ng	By Vates SAS	x86, x86-64, ARM, IA-64 (inactive), PowerPC (inactive)	Same as host	No host OS	Linux, FreeBSD, MiniOS, NetBSD, Solaris, Windows, Windows Server 2008 (with Intel VT-x or AMD-V), Plan 9	GNU GPLv2 +
XenServer	By Citrix Systems	x86, x86-64, ARM, IA-64 (inactive), PowerPC (inactive)	Same as host	No host OS	Linux, FreeBSD, MiniOS, NetBSD, Solaris, Windows 7/XP/Vista/Server 2008 (with Intel VT-x or AMD-V), Plan 9	GNU GPLv2 +
XtratuM	fentISS	SPARC v8 LEON2/3/4, ARM v7	Same as host	No host OS	GPOS: Linux, RTOS: LithOS, RTEMS	Proprietary, GPL version 2 depending on versions
z/VM	IBM	z/Architecture	z/Architecture, z/VM does not run on predecessor mainframes	No host OS, itself (single or multiple levels/versions deep; e.g., VM/ESA running in z/VM 4.4 in z/VM 5.2 in z/VM 5.1.)	Linux on IBM Z, z/OS, z/VSE, z/TPF, z/VM, VM/CMS, MUSIC/SP, OpenSolaris for System z, predecessors	Proprietary
z LPARs	IBM	z/Architecture	z/Architecture	No host OS, Integrated in firmware of System z mainframes	Linux on IBM Z, z/OS, z/VSE, z/TPF, z/VM, MUSIC/SP, and predecessors	Proprietary
Name	Creator	Host CPU	Guest CPU	Host OS(s)	Guest OS(s)	License

== Features ==
Name	Guest OS SMP available	Runs arbitrary OS	Supported guest OS drivers	Method of operation	Typical use	Speed relative to host OS	Commercial support available
Containers, or Zones	Yes, over 500-way on current systems	No	Uses native device drivers	Operating system-level virtualization	Server consolidation with workload isolation, single workload containment, hosting, dev/test/prod	Near native	Yes
Hyper-V Server 2008 R2	Yes, up to 4 VCPUs per VM	Yes	Yes	Virtualization	Server consolidation, service continuity, dev/test, desktop virtualization, cloud computing	Up to near native	Yes
OpenVZ	Yes	No	Compatible	Operating system-level virtualization	Virtualized server isolation	Up to near native	Yes
KVM	Yes	Yes	Yes	AMD-V and Intel-VT-x	Virtualized server isolation, server/desktop consolidation, software development, cloud computing, other purposes	Up to near native	Yes
Linux-VServer	Yes	No	Compatible	Operating system-level virtualization	Virtualized server isolation and security, server consolidation, cloud computing	Up to near native	Yes
Oracle VM Server for x86	Yes	Yes	Yes	Paravirtualization and hardware virtualization	Server consolidation and security, enterprise and business deployment	Up to near native	Yes
Oracle VM Server for SPARC (LDoms)	Yes	Yes, but needs porting	Yes	Paravirtualization and hardware virtualization	Server consolidation and security, enterprise and business deployment	Up to near native	Yes
OVPsim	Yes	Yes	?	Full system simulation with optional component virtualization	Software development (early, embedded), advanced debug for single and multicore software, compiler and other tool development, computer architecture research, hobbyist	Depends on target architecture (full and slow hardware emulation for guests incompatible with host)	Yes, with commercial license from Imperas
PikeOS	Yes	Yes, but modifications required as paravirtualization is used	Yes	Paravirtualization	Safety and security critical embedded systems.	Up to near native	Yes
Simics	Yes	Yes	Yes	Full system simulation of processors, MMUs, devices, disks, memories, networks, etc.	Software development, advanced debug for single and multicore software, compiler and other tool development, computer architecture research, bug transportation, automated testing, system architecture, long-term support of safety-critical systems, early hardware availability, virtual prototyping	Depends on host machine and target architecture. Runs at near-native speeds for x86-on-x86 using VT-x, cross-simulation of other architectures can be faster or slower than real-time depending on how fast the target is and how big the target is (number of processors, number of target machines, and how much the simulation can be parallelized)	Yes
Sun xVM Server	Yes	Yes	Yes	Paravirtualization and porting or hardware virtualization	Servers, Development	Up to near native	Yes
SVISTA 2004	No	?	?	?	Hobbyist, Developer, Business workstation	?	?
TRANGO	Yes	Yes	Yes	Paravirtualization and porting or hardware virtualization	Mob. phone, STB, routers, etc.	Near native	?
User Mode Linux	?	No	special guest kernel+modules required	Porting	Developer (as a separate machine for a server or with X11 networking)	Non-significantly slower than native (all calls to kernel are proxied)	?
OKL4 Microvisor	Yes	Yes, (either with para-virtualization or HW virtualization)	Yes	Paravirtualization, Hardware assisted virtualization	Mobile, embedded, security, safety critical, networking, legacy OS, etc.	Near native	Yes
Oracle VirtualBox	Yes	Yes	Yes	Virtualization	Business workstation, server consolidation, service continuity, developer, hobbyist	Up to near native	Yes (with commercial license)
Virtual Iron 3.1	Yes, up to 8 way	Yes	Yes	Native virtualization	Server consolidation, service continuity, dev/test	?	Yes
Virtual PC 2007	No	Yes	Yes	Virtualization, guest calls trapping where supported	Hobbyist, Developer, Business workstation	Up to near native with virtual machine additions	?
Windows Virtual PC	Yes	Yes	Yes	Hardware virtualization	Developer, Business workstation, support for Compatibility with Windows XP applications	Up to near native with virtual machine additions	No
Virtual PC 7 for Mac	No	Yes	Yes	dynamic recompilation (guest calls trapping where supported)	Hobbyist, Developer, Business workstation	Slow	?
Virtual Server 2005 R2	No	Yes	Yes	Virtualization (guest calls trapping where supported)	Server, server farm	Up to near native with virtual machine additions but slower than with hypervisor due to proxied calls	?
CoWare Virtual Platform	Yes	Yes	Yes ( Same compiled Software image as for the real device)	Full-system virtualization (Processor Core ISA + Hardware + External connections)	Early embedded software development and integration (from driver to application), Multi-core software debugging and optimization	Depending on the system characteristics and the software itself, ranges from faster than real time to slow.	Yes
Virtuozzo	Yes	No	Compatible	Operating system-level virtualization	Server consolidation, service continuity, disaster recovery, service providers	Up to near native	Yes
VMware ESXi Server 5.5 (vSphere)	Yes, add-on, up to 64 way	No	Yes	Virtualization	Server consolidation, service continuity, dev/test, cloud computing, business critical applications, Infrastructure as a Service IaaS	Up to near native	Yes
VMware ESX Server 4.0 (vSphere)	Yes, add-on, up to 8 way	Yes	Yes	Virtualization	Server consolidation, service continuity, dev/test, cloud computing	Up to near native	Yes
VMware ESX Server 3.0	Yes, add-on, up to 4 way	Yes	Yes	Virtualization	Server consolidation, service continuity, dev/test	Up to near native	Yes
VMware ESX Server 2.5.3	Yes, add-on, 2 way	Yes	Yes	Virtualization	Server consolidation, service continuity, dev/test	Up to near native	Yes
VMware Fusion	Yes	Yes	Yes	Virtualization	Hobbyist, Developer, Tester, Business workstation	Up to near native	Yes
VMware Server	Yes (2-way)	Yes	Yes	Virtualization	Server/desktop consolidation, dev/test	Up to near native	Yes
VMware Workstation	Yes (2-way)	Yes	Yes	Paravirtualization (VMI) and virtualization	Technical professional, advanced dev/test, trainer	Up to near native	Yes
VMware Player	Yes	Yes	Yes	Virtualization	Technical professional, advanced dev/test, trainer, end user on prebuilt machines	Up to near native	No
Xen	Yes, v4.0.0: up to 128 VCPUs per VM	Yes	Yes	Paravirtualization and porting or hardware virtualization	Virtualized server isolation, server/desktop consolidation, software development, cloud computing, other purposes. Xen powers most public cloud services and many hosting services, such as Amazon Web Services, Rackspace Hosting and Linode.	Up to native	Yes
XCP-ng	Yes	Yes	Yes	Paravirtualization and porting or hardware virtualization	Virtualized server isolation, server/desktop consolidation, software development, cloud computing, desktop virtualization, public cloud services, hostings services and other purposes.	Up to native	Yes
XenServer	Yes	Yes	Yes	Paravirtualization and porting or hardware virtualization	Virtualized server isolation, server/desktop consolidation, software development, cloud computing, other purposes. Xen powers most public cloud services and many hosting services, such as Amazon Web Services, Rackspace Hosting and Linode.	Up to native	Yes
XtratuM	Yes	No	Yes	Paravirtualization	Embedded, safety critical, secure	Near to native	Yes
z/VM	Yes, both real and virtual (guest perceives more CPUs than installed), incl. dynamic CPU provisioning and reassignment	Yes	Yes, but not required	Virtualization (among first systems to provide hardware assists)	Servers	Near native	Yes
z LPARs	Yes, both real and virtual (guest perceives more CPUs than installed), incl. dynamic CPU provisioning and reassignment; up to 64 real cores	Yes	Yes, but not required	Microcode and hardware hypervisor	Servers	Native: System z machines always run with at least one LPAR	Yes
Name	Guest OS SMP available	Runs arbitrary OS	Supported guest OS drivers	Method of operation	Typical use	Speed relative to host OS	Commercial support available

- Providing any virtual environment usually requires some overhead of some type or another. Native usually means that the virtualization technique does not do any CPU level virtualization (like Bochs), which executes code more slowly than when it is directly executed by a CPU. Some other products such as VMware and Virtual PC use similar approaches to Bochs and QEMU, however they use a number of advanced techniques to shortcut most of the calls directly to the CPU (similar to the process that JIT compiler uses) to bring the speed to near native in most cases. However, some products such as coLinux, Xen, z/VM (in real mode) do not suffer the cost of CPU-level slowdowns as the CPU-level instructions are not proxied or executing against an emulated architecture since the guest OS or hardware is providing the environment for the applications to run under. However access to many of the other resources on the system, such as devices and memory may be proxied or emulated in order to broker those shared services out to all the guests, which may cause some slow downs as compared to running outside of virtualization.
- OS-level virtualization is described as "native" speed, however some groups have found overhead as high as 3% for some operations, but generally figures come under 1%, so long as secondary effects do not appear.
- See for a paper comparing performance of paravirtualization approaches (e.g. Xen) with OS-level virtualization
- Requires patches/recompiling.
- Exceptional for lightweight, paravirtualized, single-user VM/CMS interactive shell: largest customers run several thousand users on even single prior models. For multiprogramming OSes like Linux on IBM Z and z/OS that make heavy use of native supervisor state instructions, performance will vary depending on nature of workload but is near native. Hundreds into the low thousands of Linux guests are possible on a single machine for certain workloads.

== Image type compatibility ==
Name	floppy	ISO	folders on host	physical disk / device	raw / flat (whole disk)	raw / flat (partition)	hdd (Parallels)	QCOW (QEMU)	QCOW2 (QEMU)	QED (QEMU)	VDI (VirtualBox)	VHD (Connectix Virtual PC)	VHDX (Hyper-V)	VMDK (VMware)
86Box	Yes	Yes	CD-ROM drive only	No	Yes	No	No	No	No	No	No	Yes	No	No
Bochs	Yes	Yes	Yes	Yes	Yes	Yes	No	No	No	No	Yes	Yes	No	v3, v4
Containers, or Zones	?	?	?	?	?	?	?	?	?	?	?	?	?	?
Cooperative Linux (coLinux)	?	?	?	?	?	?	?	?	?	?	?	?	?	?
CHARON	?	?	?	?	?	?	?	?	?	?	?	?	?	?
Denali	?	?	?	?	?	?	?	?	?	?	?	?	?	?
DOSBox	Yes	Yes	Yes	Yes	Yes	?	No	No	DOSBox-X fork	No	No	No	No	No
DOSEMU	?	?	Yes	?	?	?	?	?	?	?	?	?	?	?
FreeBSD Jail	No	No	Yes	No	No	No	No	No	No	No	No	No	No	No
GXemul	?	Yes	?	?	?	?	?	?	?	?	?	?	?	?
Hercules	?	?	?	?	?	?	?	?	?	?	?	?	?	?
Hyper-V (2008 R2)	Yes	Yes	No	Yes	No	No	No	No	No	No	No	Yes	No	No
Hyper-V (2012)	Yes	Yes	No	Yes	No	No	No	No	No	No	No	Yes	Yes	No
Hyper-V (2012 R2)	Yes	Yes	No	Yes	No	No	No	No	No	No	No	Yes	Yes	No
Integrity Virtual Machines	?	?	?	?	?	?	?	?	?	?	?	?	?	?
JPC (Virtual Machine)	Yes	Yes	Yes	?	Yes	?	?	?	?	?	?	?	?	?
Linux-VServer	?	?	?	?	?	?	?	?	?	?	?	?	?	?
LynxSecure	?	?	?	?	?	?	?	?	?	?	?	?	?	?
LXC	?	?	?	?	?	?	?	?	?	?	?	?	?	?
OpenVZ	?	?	?	?	?	?	?	?	?	?	?	?	?	?
Oracle VM Server for x86	?	?	?	?	?	?	?	?	?	?	?	?	?	?
Oracle VM Server for SPARC (LDoms)	?	?	?	?	?	?	?	?	?	?	?	?	?	?
OVPsim	?	?	?	?	?	?	?	?	?	?	?	?	?	?
Parallels Desktop for Mac	?	?	?	?	?	?	Yes	?	?	?	?	?	?	?
Parallels Workstation	?	?	?	?	?	?	Yes	?	?	?	?	?	?	?
PearPC	No	Yes	No	Yes	Yes	No	No	No	No	No	No	No	No	No
PikeOS	?	?	?	?	?	?	?	?	?	?	?	?	?	?
PowerVM	?	?	?	?	?	?	?	?	?	?	?	?	?	?
QEMU	Yes	Yes	Yes	Yes	Yes	Yes	read-only	Yes	Yes	Yes	Yes	Yes	except difference type	Yes
QEMU w/ kqemu module	?	?	?	?	?	?	?	Yes	No	No	?	?	?	?
QEMU w/ qvm86 module	?	?	?	Yes	Yes	?	?	Yes	Yes	?	?	?	?	Yes
QuickTransit	?	?	?	?	?	?	?	?	?	?	?	?	?	?
SIMH	?	?	?	?	?	?	?	?	?	?	?	?	?	?
Simics	?	?	?	?	?	?	?	?	?	?	?	?	?	?
Sun xVM Server	?	?	?	?	?	?	?	?	?	?	?	?	?	?
SVISTA 2004	?	?	?	?	?	?	?	?	?	?	?	?	?	?
TRANGO	?	?	?	?	?	?	?	?	?	?	?	?	?	?
User Mode Linux	?	?	?	?	?	?	?	?	?	?	?	?	?	?
VirtualBox	Yes	Yes	With guest integration installed on guest os.	Yes	Yes	Yes	up to v2	Yes	read-only	Yes	Yes	Yes	Can read existing disks, but not create new disks.	Yes
Virtual Iron 3.1	?	?	?	?	?	?	?	?	?	?	?	?	?	?
Virtual PC 2007	Yes	Yes	?	?	?	?	No	No	No	No	No	Yes	No	No
Windows Virtual PC	Yes	Yes	?	?	?	?	No	No	No	No	No	Yes	Yes	No
Virtual PC 7 for Mac	Yes	Yes	No	No	No	No	No	No	No	No	No	Yes	No	No
VirtualLogix VLX	?	?	?	?	?	?	?	?	?	?	?	?	?	?
Virtual Server 2005 R2	?	?	?	?	?	?	?	?	?	?	?	?	?	?
Synopsys (CoWare) Virtual Platform	?	?	?	?	?	?	?	?	?	?	?	?	?	?
Virtuozzo	?	?	?	?	?	?	?	?	?	?	?	?	?	?
VMware ESX Server	?	?	?	?	?	?	?	?	?	?	?	Yes	?	?
VMware ESXi	Yes	Yes	No	Yes	No	No	No	No	No	No	No	No	No	Yes
VMware Fusion	?	Yes	?	?	?	?	?	?	?	?	?	?	?	Yes
VMware Server	?	?	?	?	?	?	?	?	?	?	?	?	?	Yes
VMware Workstation	Yes	Yes	?	Yes	?	?	?	?	?	?	?	?	?	Yes
VMware Player	Yes	Yes	?	Partial	?	?	?	?	?	?	?	?	?	Yes
Wind River Hypervisor	?	?	?	?	?	?	?	?	?	?	?	?	?	?
Wind River VxWorks MILS Platform	?	?	?	?	?	?	?	?	?	?	?	?	?	?
Xen	Yes	Yes	?	Yes	Yes	?	?	Yes	Yes	?	?	Yes	?	?
XCP-ng	?	Yes	?	Yes	?	?	?	?	?	?	?	Yes	No	?
XenServer	Yes	Yes	?	Yes	Yes	?	?	Yes	Yes	?	?	Yes	?	?
XtratuM	?	?	?	?	?	?	?	?	?	?	?	?	?	?
z/VM	?	?	?	?	?	?	?	?	?	?	?	?	?	?
z LPARs	?	?	?	?	?	?	?	?	?	?	?	?	?	?
Name	floppy	ISO	folders on host	physical disk / device	raw / flat (whole disk)	raw / flat (partition)	hdd (Parallels)	QCOW (QEMU)	QCOW2 (QEMU)	QED (QEMU)	VDI (VirtualBox)	VHD (Connectix Virtual PC)	VHDX (Hyper-V)	VMDK (VMware)

== Other features ==
Name	Can boot an OS on another disk partition as guest	USB support	GUI	Live memory allocation	3D acceleration	Snapshots per VM	Snapshot of running system	Live migration	Shared folders	Shared clipboard	PCI passthrough
KVM	Yes	Yes	Yes	Yes	Yes (via AIGLX)	Yes	Yes	Yes			Yes
User Mode Linux	Yes	No	No	No	No			No	Yes	N/A	
Containers, or Zones	Yes	Yes	Yes	Yes	Not needed	Yes	Yes	No	Yes	Not needed	Not needed
DosBox	No	No	SVN builds only	No	Glide (SVN builds only)	No	Yes	No	No	No	No
Oracle VirtualBox (formerly OSE, GPLv2), with Guest Additions (GPLv2)	Yes	Yes	Yes	Yes	Yes	Yes branched	Yes	Yes	with Guest Additions	with Guest Additions	No
Oracle VirtualBox with Extension Pack (PUEL) and Guest Additions (GPLv2)	Yes	Yes	Yes	Yes	OpenGL 2.0 and Direct3D 8/9	Yes branched	Yes	Yes	Yes	Yes	Retired (Until 6.0; Linux only)
Oracle VM Server for SPARC (LDoms)	Yes	USB 2.0	Yes	Yes	No	Yes	No	Yes	Yes	No	Yes
OKL4 Microvisor	Yes	Yes	VMs only	Yes	Yes			No			Static assignment
Virtual Iron 4.2								Yes			
Virtual PC 2007	No	No	Yes	No	No			No	Yes	Yes	
Windows Virtual PC	No	partially	Yes	No	No			No	Yes	Yes	
VirtualPC 7 for Mac	No	Yes	Yes	Yes	No			No	Yes	Yes	
Microsoft Virtual Server 2005 R2		No	Yes	No	No	?	Yes	No			
Microsoft Hyper-V Server 2008 R2	Yes	Partial support over remote desktop connections	Yes	Yes	DirectX 9.0c (via RemoteFX)	Yes branched	Yes	Yes			No
Microsoft Hyper-V Server 2012 R2	Yes	Yes	Yes	Yes	DirectX 9.0c (via RemoteFX)	Yes branched	Yes	Yes			No
Virtuozzo	Yes	Yes	Yes	Yes	No			Yes			
VMware ESX Server 3.0 atp			Yes		No	?	Yes	Yes			No
VMware ESX Server 2.5.3			Yes		No						No
VMware ESX Server 4.0 – 6.x (vSphere)	Yes	Yes	Yes	Yes	Yes	Yes	Yes	Yes	No	No	Yes
VMware Fusion 2.0	Yes	Yes	Yes	No	DirectX 9 Shader model 2			No			No
VMware Server	Yes	Yes	Yes	Yes	No	1	Yes	No	Yes	Yes	
VMware Workstation 5.5	Yes	Yes	Yes	Yes	Experimental support for DirectX 8; also supported with VMGL	Yes branched	Yes	No	Yes	Yes	No
VMware Workstation 6.0	Yes	Yes	Yes	Yes	Experimental support for DirectX 8; Also supported with VMGL	Yes branched	Yes	No	Yes	Yes	No
VMware Workstation 7.0 and 8.0	Yes	Yes	Yes	Yes	Support for DirectX 9.0c Shader Model 3 and OpenGL 2.13D.	Yes branched	Yes	No	Yes	Yes	No
VMware Player	Yes	Yes	Yes	Yes	supported with VMGL	No	No	No	Yes		No
Wind River hypervisor	Yes	Yes	Yes	Yes	Yes			No			
Wind River VxWorks MILS Platform	Yes										
Xen	Yes	Yes	Yes	Yes	Supported with VMGL	?	Yes	Yes			Yes
XCP-ng	Yes	Yes	Yes	Yes			Yes	Yes			
XenServer	Yes		Yes	Yes	Supported with VMGL	Yes	Yes	Yes			Yes
z/VM	Yes	Not applicable	Yes (zURM/HMC)	Yes	Not applicable			Yes (2011)		Not applicable	Not applicable
z LPARs	Yes	Not applicable	Yes (HMC)	Yes	Not applicable			Yes (2007)		Not applicable	Not applicable
Name	Can boot an OS on another disk partition as guest	USB	GUI	Live memory allocation	3D acceleration	Snapshots per VM	Snapshot of running system	Live migration	Shared folders	Shared clipboard	PCI passthrough

- Windows Server 2008 R2 SP1 and Windows 7 SP1 have limited support for redirecting the USB protocol over RDP using RemoteFX.
- Windows Server 2008 R2 SP1 adds accelerated graphics support for certain editions of Windows Server 2008 R2 SP1 and Windows 7 SP1 using RemoteFX.

== Restrictions ==
This table is meant to outline restrictions in the software dictated by licensing or capabilities.

Name	Maximum host cores / CPUs	Maximum host memory	Maximum host disk volume size	Maximum number of guest VM running	Maximum number of logical CPU per VM guest	Maximum amount of memory per VM guest	Maximum number of SCSI + IDE disks per VM guest	Maximum disk size per VM guest
Containers, or Zones	No theoretical limit (largest SPARC has 384 physical cores)	32 TB (largest SPARC)	No limit	8191	No limit	No limit	No limit	No limit
VMware Player 15.0	No limit	No limit	No limit	No limit	16	4 GB (32-bit); 64 GB (64-bit)	?	8 TB
VMware vSphere Hypervisor (ESXi 4.1)	160 logical cores	1 TB	2 TB minus 512 bytes	320	8	255 GB	4 IDE; 60 SCSI	2 TB minus 512 bytes
VMware vSphere Hypervisor (ESXi 5.0)	160 logical cores	2 TB	64 TB	512	32	1 TB	4 IDE; 60 SCSI	2 TB minus 512 bytes
VMware vSphere Hypervisor (ESXi 5.5) (free)	16 NUMA Nodes / 320 logical CPUs	4 TB	Depending on filesystem	512	8	1 TB	4 IDE; 60 SCSI; 120 SATA	62 TB
VMware vSphere Hypervisor (ESXi 5.5)	16 NUMA Nodes / 320 logical CPUs	4 TB	Depending on filesystem	512	64	1 TB	4 IDE; 60 SCSI; 120 SATA	62 TB
VMware vSphere Hypervisor (ESXi 6.7)	16 NUMA Nodes / 768 logical CPUs	16 TB	Depending on filesystem	1024	256	6128 GB	4 IDE; 256 SCSI; 120 SATA; 60 NVMe	62 TB
VMware vSphere Hypervisor (ESXi 7.0)	16 NUMA Nodes / 896 logical CPUs	24 TB	Depending on filesystem	1024	768	24 TB	4 IDE; 256 SCSI; 120 SATA; 60 NVMe	62 TB
VirtualBox	No limit	No limit	No limit	No limit	32	No limit	4 IDE; no limit for SATA, SCSI, SAS	GUI: 2 TB; Command line: no limit
Microsoft Hyper-V Server 2008 R2	64 cores / 8 CPUs	1 TB	No limit	384	4	64 GB	4 IDE; 256 SCSI	2 TB
Microsoft Hyper-V Server 2012	320 cores / 64 CPUs	4 TB	No limit	1024	64	1 TB	4 IDE; 256 SCSI	64 TB
Microsoft Hyper-V Server 2016	512 cores / 320 CPUs	24 TB	No limit	1024	240	12 TB	4 IDE; 256 SCSI	64 TB
Xen XCP-ng XenServer	16383 CPUs_{x86} 8 CPUs_{ARM32} 128 CPUs_{ARM64}	16 TB_{x86} 16 GB_{ARM32} 5 TB_{ARM64}	No limit	No limit	512 PV_{x86} / 128 HVM_{x86} 8_{ARM32} 128_{ARM64}	>1 TB PV_{x86} / 1 TB HVM_{x86} 16 GB_{ARM32} 1 TB_{ARM64}	?	?
Name	Maximum host cores / CPUs	Maximum host memory	Maximum host disk volume size	Maximum number of guest VM running	Maximum number of logical CPU per VM guest	Maximum amount of memory per VM guest	Maximum number of SCSI + IDE disks per VM guest	Maximum disk size per VM guest

Note: No limit means no enforced limit. For example, a VM with 1 TB of memory cannot fit in a host with only 8 GB memory and no memory swap disk, so it will have a limit of 8 GB physically.

== See also ==
- List of computer system emulators
- Comparison of application virtualization software
- Comparison of OS emulation or virtualization apps on Android
- Popek and Goldberg virtualization requirements
- Virtual DOS machine
- x86 virtualization
