= VMDK =

File format for virtual hard disk drive containers

Virtual Machine Disk Format
- Filename extension: .vmdk
- Internet media type: application/x-vmdk-disk, application/x-virtualbox-vmdk
- Developed by: VMware
- Latest release: 5.0; December 20, 2011
- Type of format: Disk image file
- Website: developer.broadcom.com/sdks/vmware-virtual-disk-development-kit-vddk/latest

VMDK (short for Virtual Machine Disk) is a file format that describes containers for virtual hard disk drives to be used in virtual machines like VMware Workstation or VirtualBox.

Initially developed by VMware for its proprietary virtual appliance products, VMDK became an open format with revision 5.0 in 2011, and is one of the disk formats used inside the Open Virtualization Format for virtual appliances.

The maximum VMDK size is generally 2TB for most applications, but in September 2013, VMware vSphere 5.5 introduced 62TB VMDK capacity.

== Support ==
All VMware virtualization products support VMDK; this includes VMware Workstation, VMware Workstation Player, VMware Server, VMware Fusion, VMware ESX, VMware ESXi, and all software-plus-service offerings that incorporate them.

Third-party software that support VMDK include:

- Parallels Desktop for Mac version 10
- QEMU
- VirtualBox
- former SUSE Studio
- former Sun xVM (ancestor of VirtualBox)
- Norton Ghost
- Paragon Hard Disk Manager
- DiskInternals VMFS Recovery

== Format ==
The VMDK format includes multiple differing subformats, some of which store metadata in an external descriptor file, while others embed it with the main data in a single file. A flat image allocates space ahead of time while a sparse image grows as the virtual machine writes to it. Flat images can use the underlying file system's sparse file capability, as is done with the vmfs format on ESXi. An image can also refer to a parent image and only store changes made in a copy-on-write fashion. This enables creating a snapshot of a virtual machine's state.

=== Extents ===
The descriptor specifies a series of one or more extents that typically refer to a file or device that holds the actual data, unless for example they are of type ZERO, which emulates a zero-filled extent. Each extent can be marked either RW, RDONLY, or NOACCESS to signify that the virtual machine should have respectively read/write, read-only, or no access to that part of the disk. The number and types of extents in an image depend on its createType. An image with createType="custom" can contain an arbitrary combination of extents.

== Virtual disk provisioning options ==
Flat disk images can be provisioned in one of three ways:

- thin: Blocks are not allocated or zeroed during initial provisioning. Instead, the image is created as a sparse file. Block allocation and zeroing is performed at first access.
- zeroedthick: Blocks are allocated during initial provisioning but are not zeroed until first access.
- eagerzeroedthick: Blocks are allocated and zeroed during initial provisioning.

== See also ==
- Virtual disk
