= John Paul College =

John Paul College may refer to:

- John Paul College (Brisbane), Queensland, Australia
- John Paul College, Kalgoorlie, Western Australia
- John Paul College (Melbourne), Victoria, Australia
- John Paul College, Rotorua, Bay of Plenty, New Zealand
- St John Paul College, New South Wales, Australia

== See also ==
- JPC (disambiguation)
