= Oracle Enterprise Manager Ops Center =

Data center automation tool

- Developer: Oracle Corporation
- Operating system: Solaris, Oracle Linux, Red Hat Enterprise Linux
- Type: Network management
- Website: oracle.com/us/products/enterprise-manager/opscenter

Oracle Enterprise Manager Ops Center (formerly Sun Ops Center) is a data center automation tool that simplifies the discovery and management of physical and virtualized assets. Among its features it can:

- Provide a single console for the management of both the physical and virtual infrastructure in a virtualized environment
- Allow discovery of any existing infrastructure, including hardware that has just been unpacked and plugged in but has not been switched on
- Power everything up and then provision this hardware with firmware, operating system hypervisors and other applications as required
- Once operational, ensure that all the software on the servers, both physical and virtualized, can be automatically updated and patched
- Enable custom reports to be generated for operational as well as compliance purposes.

Ops Center includes a browser-based, platform-independent interface that uses AJAX.

== See also ==
- Sun xVM
- VirtualBox
- Sun VDI
