= Oracle VDI =

Computer desktop virtualization

- Original author: Sun Microsystems
- Developer: Oracle Corporation
- Final release: 3.5.3 / November 2, 2016; 9 years ago
- Type: Desktop virtualization
- Website: Official website

Oracle Virtual Desktop Infrastructure (VDI) software is a discontinued desktop virtualization product that provides desktop virtualization to replace personal computers with virtual machines (VMs) on a server. Desktops are accessed via Sun Ray Client, Oracle VDC Client (basically a software version of the Sun Ray, also using the same ALP protocol as the Sun Ray, Remote Desktop Protocol (RDP) client, or optionally through the web via Oracle Secure Global Desktop software.

== Overview ==
The product features tight integration with LDAP and Active Directory for user authentication. When accessing a VM, the user is presented with an Oracle VDI login screen. Upon entering credentials, the connection broker determines the correct VM for the user based on customizable policies. Once the VM has been determined it will be made available (resuming when suspended, starting when shut down) and the user is then redirected to the client OS or, if VirtualBox is used as virtualization backend, the RDP server built into VirtualBox. Multiple supported virtualization products were: Oracle VirtualBox (included), VMware vSphere, Microsoft Hyper-V and Remote Desktop Services. Built-in vRDP support in VirtualBox can be used to remotely access operating systems that lack a built-in RDP server, such as Linux.

== Discontinuation ==
In 2013, Oracle announced that it was discontinuing all further development of Oracle VDI, although existing customers would continue to be supported for a transitional period. Full support of Oracle VDI ended in March 2017.

== See also ==
- VirtualBox
- Sun Ray
- Sun xVM
- Sun Ops Center
