= JPC =

JPC can refer to:

== Arts and entertainment ==
- JPC (retailer) a German online seller of music and books
- The Johnson Publishing Company, publisher of Ebony and Jet magazines
- John Paul McQueen and Craig Dean, a fictional gay couple in Hollyoaks

== Education ==
- Joseph Priestley College, an FE college in Leeds, England
- John Paul College (Brisbane), a school in Queensland, Australia

== Science and technology ==
- JPC (emulator), Java PC
- Journal of Physics: Condensed Matter, formerly Journal of Physics C, a peer-reviewed journal

== Other uses ==
- Jesmond Parish Church, in Newcastle upon Tyne, England
- Joint Parliamentary Committee in India
- Junior Police Call, an organization founded by Hong Kong Police targeted at the youth
