= Virtual Iron =

US software company

- Fate: acquired by Oracle Corporation
- Headquarters: Lowell, United States

Virtual Iron Software, was located in Lowell, Massachusetts, sold proprietary software for virtualization and management of a virtual infrastructure. Co-founded by Alex Vasilevsky, Virtual Iron figured among the first companies to offer virtualization software to fully support Intel VT-x and AMD-V hardware-assisted virtualization.

As of May 2009 Oracle Corporation agreed to acquire Virtual Iron Software, Inc., subject to customary closing conditions. Oracle now declines to offer any updates or patches for current customers, even updates and patches developed before the purchase. On June 19, 2009, The Register reported that Oracle had killed the Virtual Iron product.

== Virtual Iron platform ==
Virtual Iron software ran unmodified 32-bit and 64-bit guest operating systems with near-native performance. A virtualization manager offered access to control, automate, modify and monitor virtual resources. Virtualization services were automatically deployed on supported hardware without additional software. The platform was based on the open source Xen hypervisor. Virtual Iron, like other virtualization software, provided server consolidation, business continuity and capacity management.

The Virtual Iron platform consisted of a virtualization manager, virtualization servers and a hypervisor. The virtualization manager (VI-Center), a Java-based application, allowed for central management of the virtualized servers. A physical server could have many virtualized servers, which ran as unmodified guest operating systems.

Virtual Iron could use both physical-storage or virtual-storage access models. However, the use of a virtual-storage access model leveraged SAN storage to create a fault-tolerant iSCSI or Fibre Channel based cluster of virtual nodes. The VI Center installed on both Windows and Linux. After installation, the administrator had to configure a "management network" for the purpose of communicating with nodes in the cluster. The VI Center used the management network to PXE boot any server that was connected and correctly configured (for PXE boot).

The included LiveRecovery tool could configure high availability. Additionally, CPU or power-consumption load-balancing was configurable using the LiveCapacity or LivePower tools respectively. Additional features included disk and virtual machine cloning (snapshots), IPMI/ILO support, etc.

== "Native virtualization" ==
Virtual Iron had implemented full virtualization (requiring hardware-assisted virtualization which it called native virtualization) over paravirtualization. Native virtualization allowed for unmodified guest operating systems and had the advantage of hardware advances for better performance. Virtual Iron, Inc claimed to have pioneered the implementation of native virtualization. Virtual Iron discussed paravirtualization and native virtualization in its blog:

Virtual Iron has decided against paravirtualization in favor of "native virtualization." With hardware advances coming out of Intel and AMD, we see native virtualization capable of matching physical hardware performance without any of the complexity and engineering efforts involved in paravirtualizing an OS. From our discussions with a broad range of users, they simply do not want to roll out modified OSs unless the trade-off is heavily in their favor. This Faustian trade-off is no longer necessary.

== See also ==
- Comparison of platform virtualization software
- Virtual machine
- Platform virtualization
- x86 virtualization
