= Parallels Workstation =

Virtual machine software

Parallels Workstation 6 for Windows and Linux
- Developer: Parallels, Inc.
- Stable release: 6 / November 8, 2011; 14 years ago
- Operating system: (Discontinued) as of 2013 for Microsoft Windows, Linux
- Platform: x86-compatible
- Type: Hypervisor
- License: Commercial proprietary software
- Website: parallels.com/en/products/workstation/

Parallels Workstation is the first commercial software product released by Parallels, Inc., a developer of desktop and server virtualization software. The Workstation software comprises a virtual machine suite for Intel x86-compatible computers (running Microsoft Windows or Linux) (for Mac version, see Parallels Desktop for Mac) which allows the simultaneous creation and execution of multiple x86 virtual computers. They distributed the product as a download package. Parallels Workstation has been discontinued for Windows and Linux as of 2013.

== Implementation ==
Like other virtualization software, Parallels Workstation uses hypervisor technology, which is a thin software layer between Primary OS and host computer. The hypervisor directly controls some of the host machine's hardware resources and provides an interface to it for both virtual machine monitors and primary OS. This allows virtualization software to reduce overhead. Parallels Workstation's hypervisor also supports hardware virtualization technologies like Intel VT-x and AMD-V.

== Features ==
Parallels Workstation is a hardware emulation virtualization software, in which a virtual machine engine enables each virtual machine to work with its own processor, RAM, floppy drive, CD drive, I/O devices, and hard disk – everything a physical computer contains. Parallels Workstation virtualizes all devices within the virtual environment, including the video adapter, network adapter, and hard disk adapters. It also provides pass-through drivers for parallel port and USB devices.

Because all guest virtual machines use the same hardware drivers irrespective of the actual hardware on the host computer, virtual machine instances are highly portable between computers. For example, a running virtual machine can be stopped, copied to another physical computer, and restarted.

Parallels Workstation can virtualize a full set of standard PC hardware, including:

- A 64-bit processor with NX and AES-NI instructions.
- A generic motherboard compatible with Intel P965 chipset.
- Up to 64 GB of RAM.
- VGA and SVGA video cards with VESA VBE 3.0 support and up to 256 MB of VRAM.
- A 1.44 MB floppy drive, which can be mapped to a physical drive or to an image file.
- Up to four IDE devices. This includes virtual hard drives that range in size from 20 MB to 128 GB each and CD/DVD-ROM drives. IDE devices can be mapped to physical drive or to an image file.
- Up to 16 SATA devices including hard disks and CD/DVD drives.
- Up to four serial ports that can be mapped to a real port, to a pipe or to an output file.
- Up to three bi-directional parallel ports, each of which can be mapped to a real port, to a real printer or to an output file.
- An Ethernet virtual network card compatible with Realtek RTL8029(AS) with full IPv6 support.
- USB 2.0 controller.
- An AC'97 compatible sound card.
- A 104-key Windows enhanced keyboard and a PS/2 wheel mouse.

== Officially supported guest operating systems ==
- Windows 7, Windows Vista, Windows XP
- Linux distributions: Debian 6.0, Fedora 14 & 15, OpenSuse 11.1, RHEL 6, SLED 11 SP1, Ubuntu 10.10, 11.04 and 11.10
- OS X

== System requirements ==
The last version of Parallels Workstation (version 6) requires:

- CPU: Minimum 1.66 GHz, x86 or x86-64. To run 64-bit guest operating systems, a processor supporting the Intel VT-x hardware virtualization technology is recommended.
- RAM: at least 2GB is required, but 4GB and above are recommended.

== See also ==
- Parallels Desktop for Mac
- Comparison of platform virtualization software
- Hypervisor
- Virtual appliance
- Virtual machine
- x86 virtualization
- Virtual disk image
