= Media-embedded processor =

A media-embedded processor (MeP) is a configurable 32-bit processor design from Toshiba Semiconductor for embedded media processing applications.
