= VMware Server =

Virtualization software suite

- The web interface of VMware Server 2.0.0
- Developer: VMware
- Final release: 2.0.2 (Build 203138) / October 26, 2009
- Operating system: Microsoft Windows; Linux
- Platform: x86-compatible
- Type: Hypervisor
- License: Freeware (certain underlying components used are open-source)
- Website: vmware.com/products/server at the Wayback Machine (archived 2007-03-04)

VMware Server 1.0.6 for Windows running Linux as a guest

VMware Server (formerly VMware GSX Server) is a discontinued free-of-charge virtualization-software server suite developed and supplied by VMware, Inc.

VMware Server has fewer features than VMware ESX, software available for purchase, but can create, edit, and play virtual machines. It uses a client–server model, allowing remote access to virtual machines, at the cost of some graphical performance (and 3D support). It can run virtual machines created by other VMware products and by Microsoft Virtual PC.

VMware Server can preserve and revert to a single snapshot copy of each separate virtual machine within the VMware Server environment. The software does not have a specific interface for cloning virtual machines, unlike VMware Workstation.

VMware Server has largely been replaced by the "Shared Virtual Machines" feature, introduced in VMware Workstation 8.0 and onwards.

== Naming ==
The former name GSX Server allegedly stands for Ground Storm X, an early code name for the project.

== Versions ==
=== VMware Server 1.0 ===
VMware released version 1.0 of Server on July 12, 2006, replacing the discontinued VMware GSX Server product-line. VMware Inc continued to develop the VMware Server 1.0.x series, issuing a maintenance release (version 1.0.10) on 26 October 2009.

=== VMware Server 2.0 ===
VMware Server 2 runs on several server-class host operating systems, including different versions of Microsoft Windows Server 2000, 2003, and 2008, and mainly enterprise-class Linuxes. The manual explicitly states: "you must use a Windows server operating system". The product also runs on Windows 7 Enterprise Edition.

Server 2 uses a web-based user-interface, the "VMware Infrastructure Web Access", instead of a GUI. For web interfaces, VMware Server 2 and VMware vCenter 4 use the Tomcat 6 web server, while VMware vCenter 2.5 is based on Tomcat 2.5.

As part of the product, the VMware Host Agent service (also carried over to VMware Workstation Server until today) allows remote access to VMware Server functionality.

VMware server 2 supports the Microsoft Shadow Copy service. (Microsoft Virtual Server 2005 R2 SP1 also supports Shadow Copy.) Virtual machines that support this service can be backed up without stopping.

VMware Server was discontinued in January 2010; general support ended on June 30, 2011.

== See also ==
- Virtual appliance
- Virtual machine
- Platform virtualization
- x86 virtualization
- Virtual disk image
