= JPC (emulator) =

- Stable release: 3.0 / 22 February 2015; 10 years ago
- Written in: Java
- Operating system: Cross-platform
- Platform: Java
- Type: Emulator
- License: GNU General Public License
- Website: jpc.sourceforge.net

JPC is an x86 emulator written in pure Java. It can run on any platform that supports the Java virtual machine. It creates a virtual PC compatible machine that can run MS-DOS and other x86 operating systems. Programs inside JPC can run up to 20% of the native processor speed. JPC was written by the Oxford University Subdepartment of Particle Physics.

== Features ==
- Safe, secure and portable due to being 100% pure Java
- Snapshot facility
- Remote disk option
- Integrated debugger
- Network card (tested by playing network Doom)
- PC speaker emulation
- Virtual FAT32 drive to wrap a directory

== Compatibility ==
- boots DOS
- boots graphical Linux (DSL, Feather)
- boots many Linux's into text mode
- boots Windows 3.0

== Emulated hardware ==
- Southbridge chipset: PIIX3
- Chipset: Intel i440FX PCI Host Bridge
- Network device: NE2000
- Storage: P-ATA
- Real-time clock: MC146818
- Direct Memory Access Controller (DMA): Intel 8237
- Interval Timer (IT): Intel 8254
- Serial Port: 16450 UART
- Floating-point unit (FPU)

== See also ==
- Comparison of platform virtualization software
