= Daniel Aaron Aloni =

American talent agent

- Born: August 19, 1964 (age 62); Los Angeles, California
- Education: University of California at Berkeley
- Occupation: Talent agent
- Employer(s): Creative Artists Agency, United Talent Agency

Daniel Aaron Aloni or Dan Aloni (born August 19, 1964) is an American talent agent and Managing Partner at William Morris Endeavor (WME). He was previously a partner at Creative Artists Agency (CAA) and United Talent Agency (UTA), where he was Co-Head of Motion Picture Literary department.

== Background ==
Born in Los Angeles, California, Aloni was raised in Sherman Oaks. His father, Tel-Aviv-born Aminadav Aloni (1928–1999), a pianist and composer, was renowned for his Jewish compositions. Aloni's mother, Joanne, is a UCLA fine art graduate.

Aloni graduated from U.S. Grant High School, where he played varsity tennis all four years. He earned a degree in Economics and Political Science from the University of California at Berkeley. He served as Class of 1986 Class Secretary and Director of the Cal Alumni Association.

== Career ==
Some of his notable clients include Christopher Nolan, Guy Ritchie, Jim Carrey, Mike Myers, Mike Flanagan, Erik Feig (PictureStart), David Hoberman (Hobie Films), Chuck Roven (Atlas), Todd Lieberman (Hidden Pictures) and MakeReady (Brad Weston). In 2023, Aloni was the only motion picture or television agent named to the Hollywood Reporter’s list of Dealmakers of the Year.

Aloni also has returned to his roots in investment banking where he has put together financing for companies like PictureStart in conjunction with Raine Group, MakeReady with Endeavor Content financing, Apple and Nike to make sports content films.

He was responsible for managing the relationship between Endeavor Content and WME until the 80% sale of Endeavor Content to CJ Entertainment as a result of the Writers Guild of America Agreement with the talent agencies.

He began his career in finance, working as an analyst at JP Morgan in New York from 1987 to 1988. He moved on to Goldman Sachs, where he was a senior analyst from 1988 to 1990. Realizing his real interest was in the entertainment industry, he moved back to Los Angeles in 1991 and started as an agent's assistant at the UTA.

From 1991 through 2005, Aloni worked at UTA, where he rose to partner and Head of the Motion Pictures Department. In 2005, he made a highly publicized move to Creative Artists Agency (CAA), taking the majority of his clients with him. Aloni remained at CAA for seven years, where he was a partner in the Motion Picture Department. It was reported that he was unhappy while at CAA. In 2012, after failing to agree on a contract renewal, Aloni was fired from the agency.

He immediately started at William Morris Endeavor (WME) as a partner in the Motion Picture Department. He has been at WME/IMG from 2012 to present, as partner and as a member of the Leadership Committee. He then became a Managing Partner and oversees WME Independent, which arranges financing and sales of WME films.

== Controversy ==
Aloni had an abrupt exit from CAA after being courted by WME's Ari Emanuel. It was seen as one of the biggest agent moves in years, In what was considered shocking for the industry, nearly all of Aloni's clients followed him to WME.

== Philanthropy ==
Aloni has been active on the board of trustees of the Broad Stage, a Los Angeles, California-based nonprofit organization, and the Cedars Sinai Heart Foundation. He has served on the board of directors for Providence St. John's Hospital in Santa Monica, California. As of 2025, he also serves on the board of directors for the Los Angeles Police Foundation.

He is also a member of the Academy of Arts and Sciences.

== Art collection ==
Aloni is very active in the contemporary art world, and is known as a top collector.
