= Charon (software) =

CPU architecture emulation software

Charon is the brand name of a group of software-products able to emulate several CPU-architectures, especially with respect to now given legacy-platforms of the large former computer-manufacturer and industrial computing-, data-handling and information-processing company Digital Equipment Corporation, shorted known as just DEC. Thus, the given emulators available under this brand, are used to cover primarily Digital’s own former DEC-hardware platforms, which are still in use today despite its age, such as PDP-11, VAX, and AlphaServer – These support many of DEC's legacy operating-systems, including Tru64 Unix and OpenVMS. The product-range also includes virtualization-products for Sun Microsystems' SPARC-architecture and older Hewlett-Packard legacy-systems based upon HP 3000 using the older mainframe-OS MPE/iX.

Charon-branded software-products are developed by the Swiss software-company Stromasys SA, which has its headquarters in Cointrin, near Geneva.

== Products and technology ==
DEC systems are used in production despite their significant age. Some companies use them to support applications that are considered mission critical, such as core applications in banks and stock exchanges, air traffic control systems and manufacturing plants. The aging hardware and changing supplier availability are making the operation of such systems on the original hardware increasingly difficult. Porting the it to new hardware, new operating systems, and new programming languages (including libraries and interfaces) is often expensive and associated with high risk. A migration to an emulated environment can enable the use of modern x86 hardware or virtualized standard x86 servers, without having to abandon the fully functioning operating system and the application environment.

The software products being sold under the product names Charon-PDP, Charon-AXP, Charon-VAX, Charon-HPA and Charon-SSP consist of a combination of virtual machine and hardware abstraction layer. They run on Microsoft Windows, Linux or VMware ESXi and provide a virtual PDP-11, VAX, AlphaServer, HP 3000, and SPARC environment. In a first step, a configuration matching the old system is created on the host platform, thereby creating an emulated guest system behaving like the old physical server. In the second step, the operating system and – as required – associated applications and application data, are moved from the real hardware to the virtual machine. Depending on the operating system, the data is copied as physical image or file system backup. Such migrations are possible without source code changes or operating system upgrades.

== Origin of product name ==
Stromasys' product name Charon is inspired by Greek mythology. In ancient Greece, Charon was the ferry man, whose task was to transport the dead across the river called Styx to Hades. The Stromasys emulator provides virtualization of the old DEC hardware allowing old operating systems such as OpenVMS to continue working without change. Figuratively speaking, CHARON "saves" data and applications and makes them available for future use beyond the life of obsolete hardware.

== Vendor ==
After the take-over of Digital Equipment Corporation (DEC) by Compaq in January 26th, 1998 which in turn was taken over by Hewlett-Packard in 2002, the former manager Robert Boers bought the DEC European Migration and Porting Center, from which the company Software Resources International was formed. In the beginning, the company offered services for migration projects. After having performed migration, porting, and VMS system programming projects for some time, the company recognized the need for PDP-11 emulators. The development of the first PDP-11 emulator was followed by the development of additional emulators for PDP-11, VAX, Alpha, HP 3000 and SPARC systems. In 2008 the company was renamed to Stromasys SA, now a public company under Swiss law.

In December 2013, George Koukis acquired the company. Currently, the company has over 100 employees. The company, which was founded in 1998, is now led by John Prot as CEO and CTO. On March 30, 2023, Partner One, one of the fastest growing enterprise software conglomerates, announced that it had acquired Stromasys SA.
