= Sun xVM =

- Developer: Sun Microsystems
- Operating system: Solaris
- Type: Virtual machine monitor

Sun xVM was a product line from Sun Microsystems that addressed virtualization technology on x86 platforms. One component was discontinued before the Oracle acquisition of Sun; the remaining two continue under Oracle branding.

== History ==
Sun originally announced the xVM product family in October 2007. The brand at one time encompassed Sun xVM Server, Sun xVM Ops Center, and Sun xVM VirtualBox, but the latter two products abandoned the "xVM" branding in late 2009, and are now called Oracle Enterprise Manager Ops Center and Oracle VM VirtualBox.

== Products ==
=== Sun xVM hypervisor ===
The Sun xVM hypervisor was a component of Solaris based on work that was being done in the OpenSolaris Xen community. It was integrated into the OpenSolaris source base, and was available in OpenSolaris OS distributions, providing the standard features of a Xen-based hypervisor on x86-based systems.

=== Sun xVM Server ===
Sun xVM Server was based on the xVM hypervisor project. Sun planned to support Microsoft Windows, Linux, and Solaris as guest operating systems.

Various features from Sun's OpenSolaris OS underlay the guest OS as part of the hypervisor environment, including Predictive Self Healing, ZFS, DTrace, advanced network bandwidth management (from the OpenSolaris Crossbow project) as well as security enhancements.

Instead of having its own disk image format, Sun xVM Server was intended to import/export VMDK and VHD images to facilitate interoperation with VMware ESX Server and Microsoft's Hyper-V.

In early May 2009, the Xen community at OpenSolaris.org announced that separate xVM Server development would be discontinued as such, with the Xen/OpenSolaris project filling its role and the team that previously worked on xVM Server refocusing on Ops Center as the principal means of managing multiple hypervisors on multiple physical machines from a single point of control. Sun VP Steve Wilson said that xVM hypervisor support would not be part of commercial Solaris.

== See also ==
- Oracle VM Server for x86
- Oracle VM Server for SPARC
- Oracle VDI
- Xen
