= XCP-ng =

Virtualization platform based around Xen hypervisor

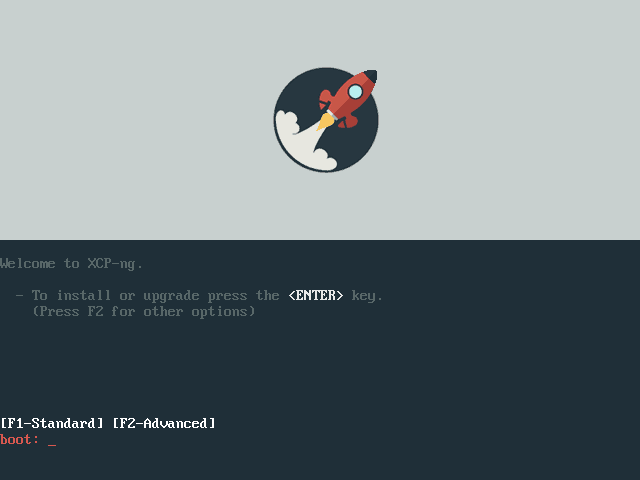
- XCP-ng 8.2 installation screen
- Developer: Vates SAS, Linux Foundation
- Written in: C (Xen, Linux kernel)
- OS family: Linux/Unix-like
- Working state: In development
- Source model: Open source
- Initial release: 31 March 2018; 8 years ago
- Latest release: 8.3.0-20250606 / 16 June 2025; 16 months ago
- Repository: github.com/xcp-ng/
- Marketing target: Servers
- Update method: Yum
- Package manager: RPM
- Supported platforms: x86-64
- Kernel type: Xen (hypervisor)
- Userland: GNU
- Default user interface: Bash, API
- License: GPLv2 and others
- Preceded by: XenServer
- Official website: xcp-ng.org

XCP-ng is a Linux distribution of the Xen Project, with pre-configured Xen Hypervisor and the Xen API project (XAPI) working out-of-the-box. The project was born in 2018, following the fork of Citrix XenServer (which became "Citrix Hypervisor" and now "XenServer" again). Since January 2020, it is also part of the Linux Foundation, via the Xen Project.

== Name ==
XCP-ng stands for Xen Cloud Platform – next generation. It is the successor to XCP, initially created as an Open Source version of Citrix XenServer in 2010. At that time XenServer was closed source, with XCP being the open source version containing a subset of features.

As XenServer was open sourced in 2013, the XCP project was halted. Several years later when Citrix stopped delivering XenServer for free and via open source, the project was revived as XCP-ng.

== History ==
In December 2017, Citrix announced that they would remove important features of XenServer Free edition and make them only available on paid tiers. Also, XenServer wasn't focused toward community because:

- no public build instructions were available (Note: No instructions available on official Citrix documentation nor on the legacy XenServer community website.)
- since XenServer 7.4, it was even impossible to start a virtual machine because of some proprietary components
- community feedback was not taken into account
- no external contributions were accepted or even possible (due to the lack of publicly accessible code repository for various components)

In response, the original founder of Xen Orchestra (an Open Source web management platform for XenServer), Olivier Lambert, announced that he would revive the XCP project, with its original goals: providing a Free/libre and 100% community backed version of XenServer.

Soon after, a Kickstarter campaign was started and quickly exceeded the original milestone.

On March 31, 2018, XCP-ng was announced as the first official release. After five other releases (see the releases section) and few months in beta, the first Long Term Support (LTS) version was announced in November 2020.

== Components ==
XCP-ng can be compared to a Linux distribution, but meant to run Xen out-of-the-box. It is a collection of components creating a coherent system that you can install on any x86 bare-metal server. It is based on multiple projects, like CentOS for user space packages, XAPI project for the API, Xen project for the hypervisor, Open vSwitch for the networking and so on. XCP-ng provides also extra packages that aren't available elsewhere, because non-existent or closed-sources in Citrix Hypervisor.

As a fork of XenServer with an "upstream first" philosophy, XCP-ng stays pretty close to the original Citrix project, and can be considered as a "friendly fork".

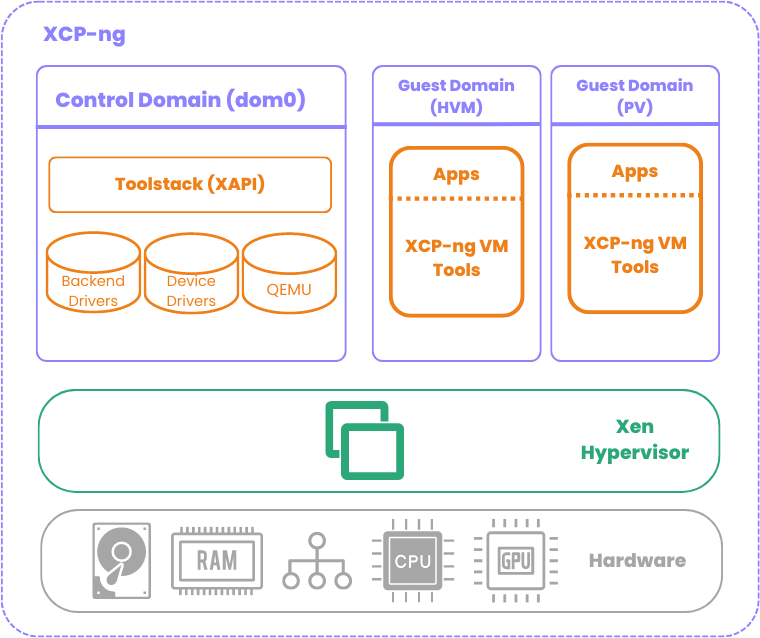

== Releases ==
XCP-ng version	Hypervisor version	Release date	Support until
7.4	Xen 4.7.5	2018-03-31	2018-10-31
7.5	Xen 4.7.5	2018-08-10	2019-07-25
7.6	Xen 4.7.6	2018-10-31	2020-03-30
8.0	Xen 4.11.1	2019-07-25	2020-11-13
8.1	Xen 4.13.0	2020-03-31	2021-03-31
8.2 LTS	Xen 4.13.1	2020-11-18	2025-09-16
8.3 LTS	Xen 4.17.5	2024-10-07	2028-11-30

=== XCP-ng 8.2 (LTS) ===
XCP-ng version	Release date
8.2.0 LTS	2020-11-18
8.2.1 LTS	2022-02-28

== See also ==
- Xen
