= Parallels Desktop for Mac =

Virtual machine software for Mac

- Developer: Parallels
- Release: June 15, 2006; 20 years ago
- Stable release: 27.0.0 (25 August 2026; 2 months ago)
- Operating system: macOS
- Platform: Apple silicon; Apple–Intel architecture (prior to version 27)
- Available in: English, Chinese Simplified, Chinese Traditional, German, Russian, French, Spanish, Italian, Japanese, Brazilian Portuguese, Korean, Polish, Czech
- Type: Hypervisor
- License: Proprietary
- Website: www.parallels.com/products/desktop/

Parallels Desktop for Mac is a hypervisor providing hardware virtualization for Mac computers. It is developed by Parallels, a subsidiary of Corel.

Parallels was initially developed for Macintosh systems with Intel processors, but version 16.5 introduced support for Apple silicon.

Microsoft officially recommends the use of Parallels Desktop for Mac to run Windows 11 on macOS, however, Parallels Desktop itself requires a paid license for use, as opposed to its competitor VMware Fusion, which is free for both personal and commercial use.

== History ==
Released on June 15, 2006, it was the first software product to bring mainstream virtualization to Macintosh computers utilizing the Apple–Intel architecture (earlier software products ran PC software in an emulated environment).

Its name initially was "Parallels Workstation for Mac OS X", which was consistent with the company's corresponding Linux and Windows products. This name was not well received within the Mac community, where some felt that the name, particularly the term "workstation", evoked the aesthetics of a Windows product. Parallels agreed: "Since we've got a great Mac product, we should make it look and sound like a Mac product..."; it was therefore renamed "Parallels Desktop for Mac".

On January 10, 2007, Parallels Desktop 3.0 for Mac was awarded "Best in Show" at MacWorld 2007.

== Technical ==
Parallels Desktop for Mac is a hardware emulation virtualization software, using hypervisor technology that works by mapping the host computer's hardware resources directly to the virtual machine's resources. Each virtual machine operates similarly to a standalone computer, with virtually all the resources of a physical computer. Because all guest virtual machines use the same virtualized hardware drivers regardless of the host computer's hardware, virtual machine instances are highly portable between computers. For example, a running virtual machine can be stopped, copied to another physical computer, and restarted.

Parallels Desktop for Mac is able to virtualize a full set of standard PC hardware, including

- A virtualized CPU of the same type as the host's physical processor,
- ACPI compliance system,
- A generic motherboard compatible with the Intel i965 chipset,
- Up to 64 GB of RAM for guest virtual machines,
- Up to 2 GB of video RAM (VRAM),
- VGA and SVGA video adapter with VESA 3.0 support and OpenGL and DirectX 10.1 acceleration,
- A 1.44 MB floppy drive, which can be mapped to a physical drive or to an image file,
- Up to four IDE devices. This includes virtual hard drives ranging in size from 20 MB to 2 TB each and CD/DVD-ROM drives. Virtual CD/DVD-ROM drives can be mapped to either physical drives or ISO image files.
- DVD/CD-ROM “pass-through” access,
- Up to four serial ports that can be mapped to a pipe or to an output file,
- Up to three bi-directional parallel ports, each of which can be mapped to a real port, to a real printer, or to an output file,
- An Ethernet virtual network card compatible with Realtek RTL8029(AS), capable of up to 16 network interface connections,
- Up to eight USB 2.0 devices and two USB 1.1 devices,
- An AC'97-compatible sound card.
- A 104-key Windows enhanced keyboard and a PS/2 wheel mouse.

== Version history ==
=== Version 2.5 ===
The first official release of version 2.5 was on February 27, 2007, as build 3186.

Version 2.5 brought support for USB 2.0 devices, which expanded the number of USB devices supported at native speed, including support for built-in iSight USB webcams. The amount of video RAM allocated to the guest OS was made adjustable, up to 32MB. Full featured CD/DVD drives arrived in this version, which allowed the user to burn disks directly in the virtual environment, and play any copy-protected CD or DVD as one would in Mac OS X. In addition, a shared clipboard and drag-drop support between Mac OS X and the guest OS was implemented. This version brought the ability for users with a Windows XP installation to upgrade to Windows Vista from within the VM environment. A new feature known as Coherence was added, which removed the Windows chrome, desktop, and the virtualization frames to create a more seamless desktop environment between Windows and Mac OS X applications. This version also allowed users to boot their existing Boot Camp Windows XP partitions, which eliminated the need to have multiple Windows installations on their Mac. A tool called Parallels Transporter was included to allow users to migrate their Windows PC, or existing VMware or Virtual PC VMs to Parallels Desktop for Mac.

==== Netsys lawsuit ====
In 2007, the German company Netsys GmbH sued Parallels' German distributor Avanquest for copyright violation, claiming that Parallels Desktop and Parallels Workstation are directly based on a line of products called “twoOStwo” that Parallels developed on paid commission for Netsys, of which it says, Netsys has been assigned all copyrights. Additionally, the lawsuit claimed that Parallels Desktop 2.5's compatibility with “twoOStwo” showed that the two software products are run by essentially the same functional core. When Netsys lost its initial urgency proceeding, it filed a new suit, in which it requested a temporary injunction from the Landgericht district court of Berlin. The requested domestic distribution ban was not enacted, and Parallels continued its operations and sales in the German market without interruption.

=== Version 3.0 ===
On June 7, 2007, build 4124 was released as the first publicly available version of Desktop 3.0.

Version 3.0 retained all of the functionality from previous versions and added new features and tools. Support for DirectX 8.1 and OpenGL was added, allowing Mac users to play some Windows games without the need to boot into Windows with Boot Camp. A new feature called SmartSelect offers cross OS file and application integration by allowing the user to open Windows files with Mac OS X programs and vice versa. Parallels Explorer was introduced, which allows the user to browse their Windows system files in Mac OS X without actually launching Windows. A new snapshot feature was included, allowing one to restore their virtual machine environment to a previous state in case of issues. Further, Parallels added a security manager to limit the amount of interaction between the Windows and Mac OS X installations. This version included a long-awaited complete “Parallels tools'” driver suite for Linux guest operating systems. Therefore, integration between Mac OS X and Linux guest-OS's was greatly improved.

Despite the addition of numerous new features, tools and added functionality, the first iteration of Parallels Desktop for Mac 3.0 was missing some of the features that Parallels had planned for it. A Parallels, Inc. representative stated at MacWorld in January 2007 that version 3.0 would bring accelerated graphics, “multi-core virtual machines/virtual SMP, some SCSI support, a more Mac-like feel, as well as a more sophisticated coherence mode, dubbed Coherence 2.0”. While accelerated graphics have materialised, Coherence, as well as the overall look and feel of Parallels Desktop for Mac has only changed slightly. Also, SCSI support has not been implemented.

It is currently unknown if these features have been abandoned altogether, or if they will show up in a later build of version 3.0.

Build 4560, released on July 17, 2007, added an imaging tool which allowed users to add capacity to their virtual disks.

==== Feature update ====
Parallels Coherence in Exposé

Build 5160, released on September 11, 2007, added some new features and updated some current features.

The release focused on updates to Coherence, with support for Exposé, window shadows, transparent windows, and the ability to overlap several Windows and Mac windows. Further, Parallels' Image Tool was updated to allow one to change their virtual hard disk format between plain and expanding. Parallels Explorer was updated to allow for one to automatically mount an offline VM hard drive to the Mac desktop. Some new features added are iPhone support in Windows, allowing iTunes in Windows to sync with it. Users can now mirror desktops or other folders. Further, Mac drives can now be mapped by Windows and sound devices can now be changed ‘on the fly’. Up to 2 GB of RAM can be allocated to a virtual machine, with a total of 4 GB of RAM available.

Parallels Desktop for Mac Build 5608 added support for guest Parallels Tools for Linux in the latest Linux distributions (including Ubuntu 8). It also added support for running 3D graphics in Windows virtual machines on Mac OS X Leopard 10.5.3.

==== Use of code from the Wine project ====
According to Parallels' Licensing page, Desktop for Mac version 3.0 contains Direct3D code that was originally developed by the Wine open-source project. Wine software is licensed under the GNU Lesser General Public License, which required Parallels to release the source code. Parallels released the modified source code on July 2, 2007, about 2 weeks after the promised release date. A Parallels spokesman explained the reasons for the delay in a message on the official company blog.

=== Version 4.0 ===
Version 4.0, released November 11, 2008, updates its GUI, adds some new features, enhances its performance by up to 50% and consumes 15–30% less power than previous versions. Version 4.0 is the first version that supports both 32-bit and 64-bit guest operating systems. Parallels Desktop 4.0 for Mac's 3D support includes DirectX 9.0, DirectX Pixel Shader 2.0 and OpenGL 2.0 as well as 256 MB video memory. It also adds support for 8 GB RAM in a virtual machine and 8-way SMP. Parallels Desktop 4.0 introduces an adaptive hypervisor, which allows users to focus the host computer's resources towards either host or the guest operating system.

Parallels Desktop 4.0 for Mac adds some new features such as:

- A fourth viewing mode called Modality, which allows users to scale the size of an active guest operating system on the Mac's desktop
- A new screenshot utility called Clips, which lets users take and share screenshots between the host and the guest operating systems.
- Start Menu integration and Automatic Windows Notifications on the Apple Menu Bar.
- The ability to use select voice commands to remotely control the virtual machine.
- The ability to start and stop a virtual machine via the iPhone. (Requires installing an iPhone application from Apple's AppStore.)

Starting with the Version 4.0 release, Parallels Desktop for Mac has a new logo, which resembles an aluminum iMac, with what appears to be Windows XP on the screen and 2 parallel red lines overlaid on the right side.

==== Feature update ====
Build 3810, released January 9, 2009, includes performance enhancements and features, such as DirectX 9.0 Shaders Model 2 and Vertex Shader support for additional 3D support Intel Streaming SIMD Extensions (SSE4) for better media applications performance. Build 3810 also adds support for running Windows 7 in a VM and for running Mac OS X Snow Leopard Server as either a host or as a guest OS.

Also included are usability features such as the ability to share Windows files by dragging them directly to a Mac application in the Mac Dock. Windows can now also automatically start in the background when a user opens a Windows application on the Mac desktop. Version 4.0 drew criticism for problems upgrading from Version 3.0 shortly after its initial release. Build 3810 also addresses installation and upgrade issues previously experienced with Version 4.0 and introduces the option to enroll in the company's new Customer Experience Program, which lets customers provide information about their preferences and user priorities.

=== Version 5 ===
Officially released on November 4, 2009, Parallels Desktop 5 adds several new features, mainly to improve integration with the host OS.

New features include:

- 3D graphics and speed improvements
- Optimized for Mac OS X 10.6 (Snow Leopard)
- Support for Windows 7
- Theming of Windows applications to make them look like native applications
- Support for Multi-Touch gestures (from a trackpad or Magic Mouse) and the Apple Remote
- The ability to drag and drop formatted text and images between Windows, Linux, and Mac applications,
- The ability for a system administrator to lock down a virtual machine so that users can't change the state of the virtual machine,
- Support for OpenGL 2.1 for Linux guest virtual machines.
- Support for DirectX 9c with Shader Model 3.

==== Feature update ====
Build 9308, released on December 21, 2009, added some new features.

===== Linux guest operating systems =====
- Parallels Tools support Xorg 1.7 in Fedora 12 virtual machines (experimental)
- Parallels Tools support Mandriva 2010 (experimental)
- OpenSUSE 11.1 installation media auto detection

===== Virtualization =====
- Improved performance for USB mass storage.

===== Windows guest operating systems =====
- Improved resume from suspend in virtual machines with multiple monitors assigned.
- Improved performance for file access via Shared Folders.

===== 3D and video =====
- Improved performance for video playback in Windows Vista and Windows 7.
- Windows Aero is not available by default for machines with Intel GMA X3100 and GMA 950 graphic adapters (some MacBook and Mac Mini models). It is available on MacBooks with NVIDIA 9400M graphics cards.
- Vertical synchronization is now configurable. You can configure these settings using the corresponding option in the virtual machine video configuration page.
- Improved 3D performance for the video game Mirror's Edge.

===== macOS Server guest operating system =====
- The ability to pass kernel options to the macOS Server guest OS has been added. To do so, enable the "Select boot device on startup" option in the virtual machine configuration, which will enable you to specify the necessary kernel options in the 5-second timeout before booting the kernel.

=== Version 6 ===
Officially announced on September 9, 2010, and launched on September 14, 2010, Parallel 6 has full 64-bit support for the first time. Parallels claims that Parallels Desktop 6 for Mac "[has] over 80 new and improved features, including speed 40% above the previous version." Specific new features include:

- An all-new 64-bit engine
- 5.1 Surround Sound support
- Better import implementation of VMware, Virtual PC virtual machines and Boot Camp partitions
- Improved network, hard drive and Transporter performance
- Windows program Spotlight integration
- Faster Windows launch time
- Enhanced 3D graphics that are 40% better than previous versions
- Ability to extend Mac OS X Parental Controls to Windows applications
- Ability to use Mac OS X keyboard shortcuts in Windows applications
- Enhanced Spaces and Exposé support

=== Version 7 ===
Officially announced on September 1, 2011, and released on September 6, 2011, Parallels Desktop 7 adds many new features. These include:

- Integration with OS X 10.7.4 "Lion":
  - Full-screen support
  - Use of Launchpad for Windows apps
  - Mission Control support
  - Lion as a guest OS
  - Lion animations support
- Improved user interface
- New standard help and documentation
- Shared devices with Mac OS X
- Longer battery life
- Mac OS X parental controls support
- Support for Intel AES-NI encryption
- Enhanced performance and 3D graphics
- Support for up to 1GB video memory in virtual machine
- Enhanced audio support - up to 192 kHz
- Surround sound 7.1
- Added support for Windows 7

=== Version 8 ===
Officially announced August 22, 2012 and released September 4, 2012, Parallels Desktop 8 adds many new features:

- OS X 10.8 "Mountain Lion" as a guest OS
- Retina resolution can be passed to virtual machines
- Windows 7 and Windows 8 automatically optimised for best experience on Retina
- Parallels Desktop notifications
- Notification Center support for Windows 8 toast notifications
- Mountain Lion Dictation in Windows apps
- Full screen on demand for Windows applications in Coherence
- Presentation Wizard
- Open in Internet Explorer button for Safari
- Drag & drop file to Outlook in the Dock opens new email with attachment
- Multi-language Keyboard Sync in Mac and Windows
- Full support for new Modern UI Windows 8 applications (Dock, Mission Control, Launchpad)
- Reworked Keyboard shortcuts preferences
- Use the standard OS X system preferences to set Parallels Desktop application shortcuts.
- Resources (CPU/RAM) monitoring
- Indication for VM hard drive space usage
- Shared Bluetooth
- Improved Virtual Machine boot time/Windows boots time are up to 25% faster than previous version
- Pause & resume Windows up to 25% faster than previous version
- Input/output (I/O) operations are up to 35% faster than previous version
- Games run up to 30% faster than previous version
- DirectX 10 support
- Full USB 3.0 support for faster connections to peripheral devices for Virtual Machines starting from Parallels Desktop 8.0.18305

=== Version 9 ===
Officially announced on August 29, 2013, and released on September 5, 2013, Parallels Desktop 9 for Mac includes these new features and enhancements:

- Brings back the "real" Start menu for Windows 8 and enables Modern apps in separate windows instead of full screen
- Power Nap support, so applications stay up-to-date on Retina Display Mac and MacBook Air computers
- Thunderbolt and Firewire storage devices are designated to connect to Windows virtual machine
- Sticky Multi-monitor setup remembers settings and puts Windows virtual machines back into Full Screen mode on the remote monitor
- Sync iCloud, SkyDrive, Dropbox and more without unnecessary duplication of files
- Windows apps can launch the OS X Mountain Lion Dictionary with Dictionary gesture
- Enhanced integration with macOS for Linux users
- Enhanced New Virtual Machine Wizard makes it easier to set up a new virtual machine, especially on computers without hard drives
- PDF printer for Windows to print from any Windows application to a PDF on the Mac desktop, even if the application doesn't have that functionality
- Compatibility with OS X 10.9 "Mavericks"
- Easily install and access complimentary security software subscriptions from one location
- Up to 40% better disk performance than previous versions
- Virtual machines shut down up to 25% faster and suspend up to 20% faster than with Parallels Desktop 8
- 3D graphics and web browsing are 15% faster than in Parallels Desktop 8

Enterprise version:

- Set an expiration date for the virtual machine.
- Run virtual machines in headless mode.
- Start virtual machines on Mac boot.

Version 9 is the last version to support Snow Leopard.

=== Version 10 ===
Released August 20, 2014, Parallels Desktop 10 for Mac includes support for OS X 10.10 "Yosemite", and ends support for Snow Leopard.

Less than a year after its release, Parallels spokesperson John Uppendahl confirmed version 10 will not be fully compatible with Windows 10. The coherence mode, which integrates the Windows user interface with OS X, will not be updated and users will need to purchase and upgrade to version 11 to continue using this feature.

=== Version 11 ===
Released August 19, 2015, Parallels Desktop 11 for Mac includes support for Windows 10 and is ready for OS X 10.11 "El Capitan".

Parallels Desktop 11 for Mac is available as a one-time purchase of $79.99 for the Desktop edition, and as an annual subscription of $99.99 for Pro edition. Version 11 has multiple issues with macOS 10.13, High Sierra. The website currently offers a full price upgrade to Version 13 as a correction, effectively making this version obsolete with the macOS upgrades.

=== Version 12 ===
Released August 18, 2016.

=== Version 13 ===
Released August 22, 2017, Parallels Desktop 13 for Mac provides macOS High Sierra readiness and support for upcoming Windows 10 features. According to Parallels, the new version makes it simple for MacBook Pro users to add Windows applications to the Touch Bar, and to use the Touch Bar within Windows applications. It is also the first solution to bring the upcoming Windows 10 People Bar feature to the Mac, including integration with the Mac Dock and Spotlight. The new version also features up to 100 percent performance improvements for completing certain tasks. The update also brings in a slightly refreshed UI to better match macOS and visual improvements for Windows users on Retina displays.

=== Version 14 ===
Released August 21, 2018, Parallels Desktop 14 supports macOS 10.14 "Mojave".

=== Version 15 ===
Released August 13, 2019.

=== Version 16 ===
Released August 11, 2020., Parallels Desktop 16 for Mac comes with the following highlights:

- Is ready for the new macOS Big Sur architecture
- In Windows and Linux VMs, DirectX 11 is 20 percent faster and there are improvements for the OpenGL 3 graphics
- The battery life when users activate “Travel Mode” in Windows is up to 10 percent longer
- In Windows apps users can now use zoom and rotate with Trackpad in Windows apps
- More printing options: Print on both sides and paper sizes from A0 to envelope.

New features are added to Parallels Desktop for Mac Pro Edition:

- Easier export a virtual machine in a compressed format and prepare it for transfer to another Mac or an SSD
- Give custom networks an individual name

On April 14, 2021, Parallels updated the software to version 16.5, notably adding support for Apple silicon-based Macs. On such Macs, only ARM-compatible OSes can be run in VMs; Parallels does not yet emulate the x86 architecture. Supported guest OSes include Windows Insider builds of Windows 10 (as no retail ARM versions of Windows 10 nor installation disk images for such versions are publicly available), as well as ARM builds of various Linux distributions.

=== Version 17 ===
Released August 10, 2021, Parallels Desktop 17 for Mac comes with the following highlights:

- Optimized for Apple M1 chip.
- Added support for USB 3.1 devices.
- Added multi-monitor support for Linux.
- Added drag-and-drop support for text or graphics between Mac and Windows applications.
- Version 17.1, released October 14, 2021, is fully compatible with macOS Monterey and adds support for Windows 11 as a guest OS.

=== Version 18 ===
Released August 9, 2022, Parallels Desktop 18 for Mac comes with the following highlights:

- Brings full support for the ProMotion displays in the 14-inch and 16-inch MacBook Pros.
- Easier Windows 11 setup.
- Enhanced Windows game-play experience on a Mac.
- Version 18.1, released November 1, 2022, is fully compatible with macOS Ventura and adds support for assigning up to 128GB of RAM to VMs on Macs with the M1 Ultra chip.

=== Version 19 ===
Released August 21, 2023, Parallels Desktop 19 for Mac comes with the following highlights:

- Improvements to compatibility with macOS Sonoma both as a host and as a guest OS.
- New app icon.
- Ability to use Touch ID for Windows sign-in.
- Improved OpenGL support up to version 4.1 (From Parallels Desktop 18's OpenGL 3.3 Compatibility Profile support.)
- Improvements to running macOS as a guest OS, including installation from an IPSW image, basic VM operations, mass deployment functionality etc.

=== Version 20 ===
Released September 10, 2024, Parallels Desktop 20 for Mac comes with the following highlights:

- Adds support for macOS Sequoia as both a host and guest OS.
- Rework to Parallels Tools, increasing reliability and usability, for all supported platforms.
- Adds support for Windows 11 24H2. For Apple silicon Macs, this should improve speed and stability to x86 apps for Windows.
- Removes support for Network Boot.
- For Intel Mac hosts, support for USB and network kexts in guest OS's has been removed.

=== Version 26 ===
Released August 26, 2025. Adds support for macOS Tahoe.

=== Version 27 ===
Released August 25, 2026. Parallels Desktop 27 for Mac comes with the following highlights:

- Adds support for macOS Golden Gate
- Removes support for Intel Macs, as well as macOS Ventura.
- Exclusive to Pro Edition, Windows virtual machines now run on a reengineered OpenGL driver, with raised support from OpenGL 4.1 to 4.3.

== Supported operating systems ==
Parallels Desktop for Mac Business, Home and Pro Editions requires these versions of macOS:

		Parallels Desktop Version																				
Macintosh OS host version		27	26	20	19	18	17	16	15	14	13	12	11	10	9	8	7	6	5	4	3	2.5
macOS 27 Golden Gate	27	✓	✓	✓^{C}																		
macOS 26 Tahoe	26	✓	✓	✓^{C}																		
macOS 15 Sequoia	15	✓	✓	✓	✓^{C}																	
macOS 14 Sonoma	14	✓	✓	✓	✓	✓^{C}																
macOS 13 Ventura	13		✓	✓	✓	✓	✓^{C}															
macOS 12 Monterey	12			✓	✓	✓	✓															
macOS 11 Big Sur	11					✓	✓	✓^{C}														
macOS 10.15 Catalina	10.15					✓	✓	✓	✓^{C}													
macOS 10.14 Mojave	10.14					✓	✓	✓	✓		✓^{C}											
macOS 10.13 High Sierra	10.13						✓	✓	✓	✓^{AB}	✓^{AB}											
macOS 10.12 Sierra	10.12							✓	✓	✓	✓	✓	✓									
OS X 10.11 El Capitan	10.11									✓	✓	✓	✓									
OS X 10.10 Yosemite	10.10									✓	✓	✓	✓	✓								
OS X 10.9 Mavericks	10.9											✓	✓	✓	✓							
OS X 10.8 Mountain Lion	10.8												✓	✓	✓							
OS X 10.7 Lion	10.7.5 10.7.0												✓	✓	✓	✓						
OS X 10.6 Snow Leopard & OS X 10.6 Snow Leopard Server	10.6.8 10.6.3 10.6.0													✓	✓	✓	✓	✓	✓	✓		
OS X 10.5 Leopard & OS X 10.5 Leopard Server	10.5.8 10.5.2																✓	✓	✓	✓		
OS X 10.4 Tiger & OS X 10.4 Tiger Server	10.4.11 10.4.6																				✓	✓

Parallels Desktop 11 and 12 only partially support macOS High Sierra:

^{A} Coherence Mode windows may appear under macOS windows, and some graphics artifacts may occur.

^{B} Neither Parallels Desktop 11 nor 12 fully support Apple File System (APFS) disks, including virtual disks and Boot Camp partitions. Therefore, a High Sierra guest machine must be installed 'manually' by passing the "--converttoapfs NO" command line switch, and cannot use the automated Parallels virtual machine creation process.

^{C} Versions are partially compatible with the corresponding macOS versions and may not work correctly.

=== Guest ===
Parallels Desktop 16 for Mac includes support for a variety of different guest operating systems:

- Several versions of Windows: Windows 11 (recommended) as well as Windows 10, Windows 8.1, Windows 8, Windows Server 2019, Windows Server 2016, Windows Server 2012 R2, Windows 7 (SP0-SP1), Windows Server 2008 R2 (SP0-SP2), Windows Vista Home, Business, Ultimate and Enterprise (SP0-SP2), Windows Server 2003 R2 (SP0-SP2), Windows XP (SP0-SP3), Windows 2000 Professional SP4, Windows 2000 Server SP4
- Linux distributions: Red Hat Enterprise Linux (RHEL) 8, 7 and 6, CentOS Linux 8, 7 and 6, Fedora Linux 32, 31, 30 and 29, Ubuntu 20.04, 19.10, 19.04, 18.04 LTS and 16.04 LTS, Debian GNU/Linux 10, 9 and 8, Suse Linux Enterprise 15, OpenSUSE Linux 15.2, 15.1 and 15, Linux Mint 20, 19 and 18, Kali 2020.2, 2019 and 2018, elementary OS 5.0, Manjaro 18, Mageia 7 and 6 and more
- Android (only when users download the version with the Installation Assistant with Parallels Desktop)
- It is also possible to install macOS versions in a VM: macOS Big Sur 11, macOS Catalina 10.15, macOS Mojave 10.14, macOS High Sierra 10.13, macOS Sierra 10.12, OS X El Capitan 10.11, OS X Yosemite 10.10, OS X Mavericks 10.9, OS X Mountain Lion 10.8, OS X Lion 10.7, OS X Lion Server 10.7, Mac OS X Snow Leopard Server 10.6, Mac OS X Leopard Server 10.5

In Parallels Desktop 10 for Mac, support for guest operating systems includes a variety of 32-bit and 64-bit x86 operating systems, including:

- MS-DOS
- Multiple versions of Windows, including Windows 8 and Windows 8.1.
- Mac OS X Leopard Server, Snow Leopard Server, and Mac OS X Lion (only with Mac OS X Lion as host OS)
- Various Linux distributions
- FreeBSD
- eComStation, OS/2, Solaris

== Parallels Server for Mac ==
Parallels Server for Mac running Mac OS X Leopard Server in a VM on top of Mac OS X Leopard Server

Parallels Server for Mac is a discontinued virtualization product built for Mac OS X Server by Parallels, Inc. After less than a year of development, an alpha version was demoed at MacWorld 2008, and the product was officially released on June 17, 2008. While in beta, Parallels Server for Mac did not allow running Mac OS X Server in a virtual machine; however, Apple relaxed its licensing restrictions before Parallels Server for Mac's public release to allow running Mac OS X Leopard Server in a virtual machine as long as that virtual machine is running on Apple hardware. Parallels Server was an enterprise product designed to handle server workloads such as databases and enterprise email. One of its featured was the Parallels Management Console, which allowed server administrators to manage the virtual machines both locally and remotely.

== See also ==
- Desktop virtualization
- Virtual machine
- Platform virtualization
- x86 virtualization
- Virtual disk image
- UTM (software)
