= Real-Time Systems (company) =

Software company headquartered in Germany

Real-Time Systems GmbH
- Company type: Private
- Industry: Computer Software
- Founded: Weingarten, Germany May 11, 2006
- Founder: Gerd Lammers
- Headquarters: Ravensburg, Germany
- Area served: Worldwide
- Products: IEEE 1588 Precision Time Protocol (PTP) Stack; RTS Real-Time Hypervisor
- Owner: congatec AG

Real-Time Systems GmbH, headquartered in Ravensburg, Germany, is a privately held software company.

Real-Time Systems develops and sells software products for embedded systems and real-time applications.

Founded in 2006 as a spin-out from industrial robot maker KUKA, Real-Time Systems is providing its solutions globally directly and through distributors and is a member of the Intel Intelligent Systems Alliance, an Intel Premier Software Partner and Microsoft Embedded Gold Partner.

Core product lines of the company are the RTS Hypervisor, a real-time capable virtualization solution for Intel Architecture, as well as protocol stacks for the Precision Time Protocol (PTP), IEEE 1588 for time synchronization over packed based networks.
