= QuickTransit =

Cross-platform virtualization software

- Developer: Transitive Corporation
- Stable release: 1.5 / 2008
- Operating system: Linux, Solaris
- License: Proprietary

QuickTransit was a cross-platform virtualization program developed by Transitive Corporation. It allowed software compiled for one specific processor and operating system combination to be executed on a different processor and/or operating system architecture without source code or binary changes.

QuickTransit was an extension of the Dynamite technology developed by the University of Manchester Parallel Architectures and Languages research group, which now forms part of the university's Advanced Processor Technologies research group.

Silicon Graphics announced QuickTransit's first availability in October 2004 on its Prism visualization systems. These systems, based on Itanium 2 processors and the Linux operating system, used QuickTransit to transparently run application binaries compiled for previous SGI systems based on the MIPS processor and IRIX operating system.

This technology was also licensed by Apple Computer in its transition from PowerPC to Intel (x86) CPUs, starting in 2006. Apple marketed this technology as "Rosetta".

In August 2006, IBM announced a partnership with Transitive to run Linux/x86 binaries on its Power ISA-based Power Systems servers. IBM named this software System p AVE during its beta phase, but it was renamed to PowerVM Lx86 upon release.

In November 2006, Transitive launched QuickTransit for Solaris/SPARC-to-Linux/x86-64, which enabled unmodified Solaris applications compiled for SPARC systems to run on 64-bit x86-based systems running Linux. This was followed in October 2007 by QuickTransit for Solaris/SPARC-to-Linux/Itanium, which enabled Solaris/SPARC applications to run on Itanium systems running Linux. A third product, QuickTransit for Solaris/SPARC-to-Solaris/x86-64, was released in December 2007, enabling Solaris/SPARC applications to run on 64-bit x86 systems running Solaris.

IBM acquired Transitive in June 2009 and merged the company into its Power Systems division. IBM announced in September 2011 it would discontinue marketing for the PowerVM Lx86 product in January 2012, withdrawing it from sale completely in April 2013. Apple removed Rosetta from Mac OS X starting with Mac OS X Lion in 2011.

Most of the original team now work for the BBC, Apple in California and ARM in Manchester.
