= VMware Workstation Player =

Virtualization software package

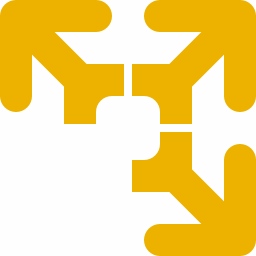
- Current icon of VMware Workstation Player used since Version 15.0 in 2018
- Developer: VMware
- Initial release: December 12, 2005
- Final release: 17.5.2 / 14 May 2024; 21 months ago
- Written in: C, C++
- Operating system: Windows, Linux
- Platform: x86-64 only
- Type: Hypervisor
- License: Freemium
- Website: www.vmware.com/products/workstation-player.html

VMware Workstation Player, formerly VMware Player, is a discontinued virtualization software package for x64 computers running Microsoft Windows or Linux, supplied free of charge by VMware, Inc. VMware Player could run existing virtual appliances and create its own virtual machines (which require that an operating system be installed to be functional). It used the same virtualization core as VMware Workstation, a similar program with more features, which became available free of charge for personal, but not commercial, use in 2024. VMware Player was available for personal non-commercial use, or for distribution or other use by written agreement. VMware, Inc. did not formally support Player, but there was an active community website for discussing and resolving issues, and a knowledge base.

The free VMware Player was distinct from VMware Workstation until Player v7, Workstation v11. In 2015 the two packages were combined as VMware Workstation 12, with a free for non-commercial use restricted Player version which, on purchase of a license code, either became the higher-specification VMware Workstation Pro, or allowed commercial use of Player.

VMware Workstation Player was discontinued as a separate product in May 2024 when VMware Workstation Pro, which includes Player, became free for personal use. Commercial users of Player could continue to use it until the end of the active support term.

== Features ==
VMware claimed in 2011 that the Player offered better graphics, faster performance, and tighter integration for running Windows XP under Windows Vista or Windows 7 than Microsoft's Windows XP Mode running on Windows Virtual PC, which is free of charge for all purposes.

Versions earlier than 3 of VMware Player were unable to create virtual machines (VMs), which had to be created by an application with the capability, or created manually by statements stored in a text file with extension ".vmx"; later versions can create VMs. The features of Workstation not available in Player are "developer-centric features such as Teams, multiple Snapshots and Clones, and Virtual Rights Management features for end-point security", and support by VMware. Player allows a complete virtual machine to be copied at any time by copying a directory; while not a fully featured snapshot facility, this allows a copy of a machine in a particular state to be stored, and reverted to later if desired. By default, changes (including proxy settings, passwords, bookmarks, installed software and malware) made in a VM were saved when it was shut down, but the .vmx configuration file could easily be edited to autorevert on shutdown, so that all changes are discarded.

VMware Player was also supplied with the VMware Workstation distribution, for use in installations where not all client users are licensed to use the full VMware Workstation. In an environment where some machines without VMware Workstation licences run VMware Player, a virtual machine created by Workstation could be distributed to computers running Player without paying for additional Workstation licenses if not used commercially.

== Version history ==
Major Version	Release date	Significant Changes
1.0	6 June 2008	First release, with x86 support
2.0	28 August 2008	
2.5	6 October 2008	
3.0	27 October 2009	GUI: Added GUI wizard for creating a new virtual machine and editing virtual machine settings; Support for Windows 7; Multiple-Monitor Display; Drag and Drop Enhancements; Virtual Printing
3.1	25 May 2010	
4.0	4 October 2011	Starting with this version, an x64 (64-bit) CPU was required; The host operating system did not need to be 64-bit; A 64-bit guest required a host CPU with Intel VT-x or AMD-V; Installation changes and enhanced keyboards; Virtual hardware improvements; Windows 8 support with 4.0.5; Documentation changes
5.0	22 August 2012	Windows 8 support; New User Interface; OpenGL 2.1 for Linux Virtual Machines; SuperSpeed USB 3.0 Support for Windows 8; Ability to run Restricted Virtual Machines; Commercial license included with Fusion 5 Professional
6.0	3 September 2013	Support for Windows 8.1 and Windows Server 2012 R2; Support for up to 16 vCPUs (up from 4); Support for up to 8 TB disks (up from 2 TB); USB Improvements (implemented USB 3 Streams); SSD Pass-through (optimized when running off SSD); Virtual Machines that expire at creator-specified time
7.0	1 December 2014	Support for 32-bit host operating system was discontinued; Support for Windows 8.1 Update; Support for Windows Server 2012 R2; Support for Windows 10 Technical Preview (Experimental support); Support for Ubuntu 14.10; Support for Red Hat Enterprise Linux 7; Support for CentOS 7; Support for openSUSE 13.2; Support for SUSE Linux Enterprise 12; VMware Hardware Version 11; Allocate up to 2 GB video memory to a virtual machine
12.0	24 August 2015	†VMware Player proper discontinued after v7; VMware Workstation Player 12 released; Support for Windows 10; Support for Ubuntu 15.04; Support for Fedora 22; Support for CentOS 7.1; Support for Red Hat Enterprise Linux 7.1; Support for Oracle Linux 7.1; Support for openSUSE 13.2; Support for VMware Project Photon; Performance improvements for suspending and resuming encrypted virtual machines; Support for 4K monitors with high resolution UI
12.1	8 December 2015	Maintenance release that resolves some known issues
12.5	13 September 2016	Support for Windows 10 Anniversary Update; Support for Windows Server 2016; Bug fixes; Included security updates; Added more performance improvements
14.0	26 September 2017	Support for pre-2010 CPUs dropped; Support for Windows 10 Creators Update; Guest operating system support: Ubuntu 17.04; Fedora 26; CentOS 7.4; RHEL 7.4; Debian 9.1; Oracle Linux 7.4; SLE 12 SP3; openSUSE 42.3; Virtual NVME Support; Secure Boot Support; Network Latency Simulation; Native OVF Support
14.1.2	21 May 2018	Host and guest operating system support: Windows 10 Spring Creators Update; Ubuntu 18.04
15.0	24 September 2018	Guest operating system support: Windows 10 1803; Ubuntu 18.04; Fedora 28; RHEL 7.5; CentOS 7.5; Debian 9.5; openSUSE Leap 15.0; FreeBSD 11.2; ESXi 6.7; DirectX 10.1; REST API Support; VCSA 6.7 Support; USB Auto connect to virtual machine
15.0.1	9 November 2018	Host and guest operating system support: Ubuntu 18.10; Fedora 29; RHEL 7.6
15.0.2	22 November 2018	Host and guest operating system support: Windows 10 October Update; Windows Server 2019
15.1	14 May 2019	Guest operating system support: Windows 10 19H1; Ubuntu 19.04; Red Hat Enterprise Linux 8.0; Fedora 30; ESXi 6.7 Update 2
15.5.0	19 Sep 2019	Guest operating system support: Windows 10 19H2; Debian 10.0/10.1; Debian 9.11; Oracle Linux 8.0; SLE 15 SP1; FreeBSD 12.0; PhotonOS 3.0; Updated so virtual networks can now be configured with MTU size of up to 9000 bytes.; Updated to make network settings save after upgrades and adds the ability to import and export network configurations; New shortcut to quickly adjust VMware display layout; Update to make PVSCSI adapters supported by Workstation, which improves the compatibility for VMs migration between Workstation and vSphere.; Open VM Tools is the default VMware Tools for applicable Linux virtual machines.; Security fixes
15.5.1	12 Nov 2019	Resolved issues: The Workstation 15.5 Player Linux installer crashes in some multi-language environments
15.5.5	28 May 2020	Windows 10 host VBS support: VMware Workstation 15.5.5 now runs on Windows hosts with Hyper-V features enabled; The followings are minimum requirement to run VMware Workstation on a Hyper-V enabled host: CPU: Intel Sandy Bridge or a newer CPU; AMD Bulldozer or a newer CPU; Supported Host OS: Windows 10 20H1 build 19041.264 or newer; Support for new Guest Operating Systems: Windows 10 20H1; Ubuntu 20.04; Fedora 32; Support for new Host Operating Systems: Windows 10 20H1; Ubuntu 20.04; Resolved issues: The Windows Operating System stops working without any message when trying to connect USB devices to the VM; The Virtual Network name does not support multi-byte characters; Known issues: VMware Player 15.5.5 installation fails on a Windows Host which doesn't have SHA-2 code signing support; Virtual machines with a bridged type network connection don't bind their network to the host's physical network adapter
15.5.6	9 Jun 2020	Resolved issues: The quality of sound playback and recording through the emulated ES1371 sound device was degraded when compared to Workstation 15.5.2 Player and earlier; The Caps Lock, Num Lock and Scroll Lock keys and indicators behaved erratically in a Linux VM in Workstation Player 15.5.5
15.5.7	19 Nov 2020	Resolved issues: Use-after-free vulnerability in the XHCI USB controller; Out-of-bounds read vulnerability due to a time-of-check time-of-use issue in ACPI device
16.0	14 Sep 2020	Removed features: Removal of restricted virtual machines; Support for Windows 7 as a host OS; can only install VMWare Player 16 series on Windows 8 or higher (64-bit only); New features Container and Kubernetes Support (requires 64-bit Windows 10 Version 1809 or higher): Build/run/pull/push container images using the vctl CLI.; Supports KIND kubernetes clusters running on top of Workstation Player.; New Guest Operating Systems supported: CentOS 8.2; Debian 10.5; ESXi 7.0; Fedora 32; FreeBSD 11.4; RHEL 8.2; SLE 15 SP2 GA; Support for DirectX 11 and OpenGL 4.1 in the Guest: For Windows hosts, requires a native GPU that supports DirectX 11.0 is required.; For Linux hosts, requires latest NVIDIA proprietary drivers are required; GNU/Linux with NVIDIA drivers that support OpenGL 4.5 and above; Windows guests supported: Windows 7 or higher; Linux guests supported: GNU/Linux with vmwgfx; Vulkan Render Support for Linux Workstation Player: Workstation 16 Player enables 3D support for Intel GPUs on Linux hosts to deliver DirectX 10.1 and OpenGL 3.3 to VMs using Vulkan Renderer (Linux host with a recent Intel/Vulkan driver is needed; Mesa 20.1 or later recommended); Sandboxed Graphics: Virtual machine security is enhanced by removing graphics render from vmx and running it as a separate sandbox process.; USB 3.1 Controller Support: The virtual machines virtual XHCI controller is changed from USB 3.0 to USB 3.1 to support 10 Gbit/s.; Larger VMs: 32 virtual CPUs (host and guest OS must both support this number); 128 GB virtual memory; 8 GB virtual graphics memory; Dark Mode: Workstation 16 Player supports Dark Mode for optimized user experience (requires Windows 10 Version 1809 or higher as the host OS); vSphere 7.0 Support: Connect to vSphere 7.0.; Upload a local virtual machine to vSphere 7.0.; Download a remote virtual machine running on vSphere 7.0 to the local desktop.; Performance Improvements: Improved file transfer speeds (Drag and Drop, Copy and Paste); Improved virtual machine shutdown time; Improved virtual NVMe storage performance.; Improved Accessibility Support: Accessibility improvements have been added so Workstation Player is compliant with WCAG 2.1 criteria; Resolved issues: After priority.ungrabbed = "low" is set in the virtual machine configuration file, the priority of vmware-vmx process shows as Normal, when checked on the Host Task manager; A Windows XP x64 virtual machine freezes during boot, when Workstation is running on Win10 host with Hyper-V Enabled; Known issues: Low performance or failures might occur when using vctl CLI on machines with HDD (Hard Disk Drive) as the system disk; After the Easy Install operation is complete, VMware Tools may fail to install as some guest operating systems, such as Windows 7, Server 2008 R2 and Server 2012 R2, need some Windows Updates to first be installed (KB4474419 and KB4490628 for Windows 7 and Server 2008 R2; KB2919355 and installation of the .NET Framework 3.5 for Server 2012 R2)
16.1.0–17.5.1		Various enhancements
17.5.2		Last version
17.6	3 Sep 2024	Available on the "Support Portal"
17.6.1	10 Oct 2024	Available on the "Support Portal"
17.6.2	17 Dec 2024	Available on the "Support Portal"
17.6.3	4 Mar 2025	Available on the "Support Portal"
17.6.4	15 Jul 2025	Available on the "Support Portal"

== Resources ==
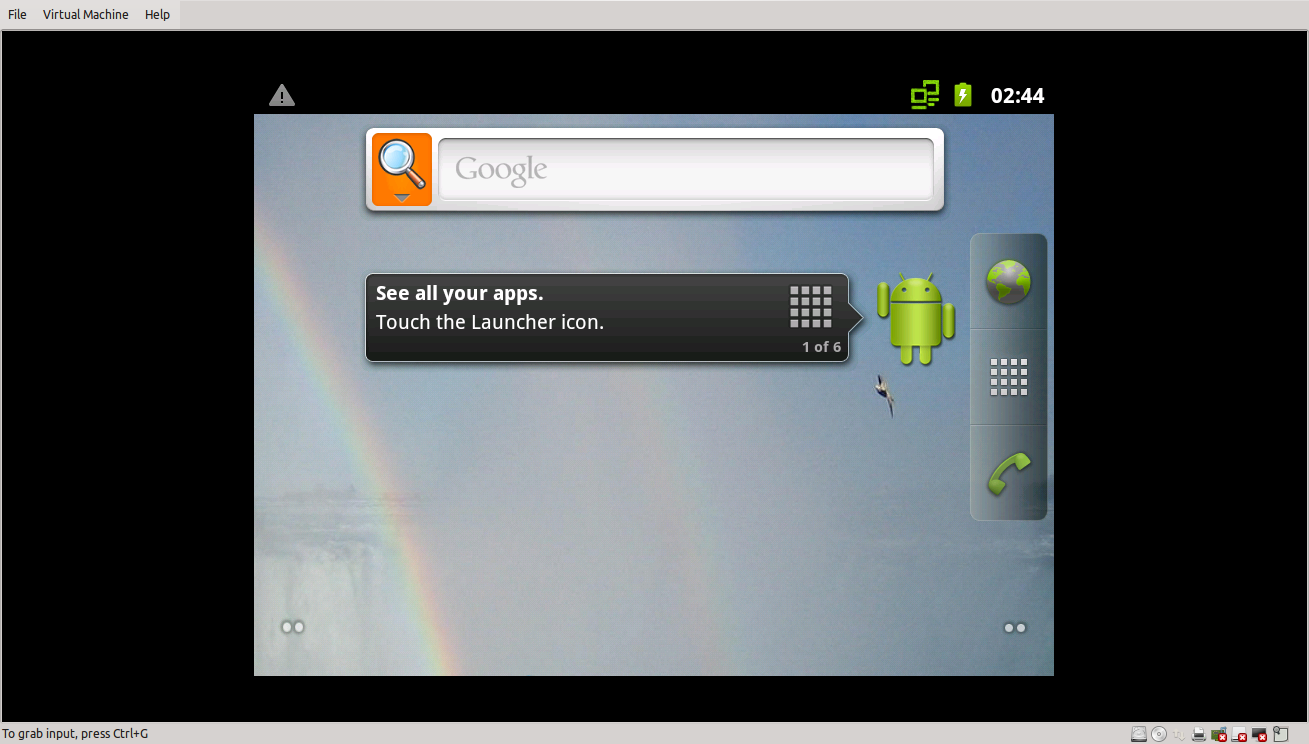
Screenshot showing Android 2.3.7 running on VMware Player 6.0

Many ready-made virtual machines (VMs) which run on VMware Player, Workstation, and other virtualization software are available for specific purposes, either for purchase or free of charge. For example, a free Linux-based “browser appliance” with the Firefox browser installed was available that can be used for safe Web browsing; if infected or damaged, it could be discarded and replaced by a clean copy. VMs could be configured to reset after each use without the need to recreate from the original file. Suppliers of operating systems with commercial licences usually required installations to be licensed; VMs with such operating systems installed could not be distributed without restriction. Ready-to-use VMs with Microsoft or Apple operating systems installed, in particular, were not distributed, except for evaluation versions.

VMware Player supported free-of-charge VMware Tools, which added significant functionality. Versions of Player for different platforms had their own Tools, not necessarily compatible with other versions. Sometimes Tools were updated belatedly; for example, Player 4.0.2 was released on 24 January 2012, but the corresponding version of Tools was not available for some time after that, restricting functionality of updated Player installations.

Virtual machines created by one VMware software product could be used by any other. It was often possible to use VMs created by one manufacturer's virtual machine software with software from another manufacturer, either directly or via a conversion procedure. VMs that ran on Microsoft Virtual Server and Virtual PC could be converted for use by VMware software by the VMware vCenter Converter. This software could also create a virtual machine from a physical PC.

== See also ==
- Comparison of platform virtualization software
