= VMware Fusion =

Software hypervisor developed by VMware for Macintosh computers

- VMware Fusion running Windows 7 on macOS 10.14.6 Mojave
- Developer: VMware
- Initial release: August 6, 2007; 18 years ago
- Stable release: 25H2 / 14 October 2025; 38 days ago
- Written in: C, x86 Assembly, C++ (GUI)
- Operating system: macOS
- Platform: Apple–Intel architecture, Apple M series (ARM64)
- Type: Hypervisor
- License: Freeware (formerly also commercial proprietary software)
- Website: www.vmware.com/products/desktop-hypervisor/workstation-and-fusion

VMware Fusion is a freeware software hypervisor developed by VMware for macOS systems. It allows Macs with Intel or Apple M series CPUs to run virtual machines with guest operating systems, such as Microsoft Windows, Linux, or macOS, within the host macOS operating system.

== Overview ==
VMware Fusion can virtualize a multitude of operating systems, including many older versions of macOS, which allows users to run older Mac software that can no longer be run under the current version of macOS, such as 32-bit and PowerPC applications.

=== History ===
VMware Fusion, which uses a combination of paravirtualization and hardware virtualization made possible by the Mac transition to Intel processors in 2006, marked VMware's first entry into Macintosh-based x86 virtualization. VMware Fusion uses Intel VT present in the Intel Core microarchitecture platform. Much of the underlying technology in VMware Fusion is inherited from other VMware products, such as VMware Workstation, allowing VMware Fusion to offer features such as 64-bit and SMP support. VMware Fusion 1.0 was released on August 6, 2007, exactly one year after being announced.

Along with the Mac transition to Apple silicon in 2020, VMware announced plans for Fusion to support the new M-series platform and ARM architecture, releasing a tech preview for M1 chips in September 2021. In November 2022, VMware Fusion 13 was released, allowing ARM virtualization on Apple Silicon chips. Coinciding with the release, VMware implemented support for TPM 2.0 and OpenGL 4.3, along with improvements to VMware Tools on Windows 11. VMware Fusion 13 retains support for Intel Macs, distributing the software as a universal binary.

On May 13, 2024, it was announced that VMware Fusion Pro would become free for personal use. Previously VMware Fusion (not Pro) was free for personal use; this edition would be discontinued, effectively replaced by the Pro edition. At the same time, commercial use would switch to an annual subscription, removing the option to buy a one-off perpetual license.

In November 2024, this change was expanded to include commercial and educational users, thereby making the software free for everyone. At the same time, however, Broadcom discontinued official technical support for the product, instead directing users to seek help from existing documentation and the community.

== System requirements ==
- Most Macs launched in 2015 or later with Apple Silicon or Intel processors for VMware Fusion 13, most Macs launched in 2012 or later for VMware Fusion 12, most Macs launched in 2011 or later for VMware Fusion 11, any x86-64 capable Intel Mac for VMware Fusion 8
- macOS Ventura or later for VMware Fusion 13, macOS Catalina or later for VMware Fusion 12, Mac OS X 10.11 El Capitan or later for VMware Fusion 11, Mac OS X 10.9 Mavericks or later for VMware Fusion 8
- Operating system installation media for virtual machines

== Operating system support ==
Host OS		Latest version	Release year
macOS	26	Current	2025
macOS	13 - 15	13.6.4	2025
macOS	12	13.5.2	2024
macOS	11	12.2.5	2022
macOS	10.15	12.1.2	2021
macOS	10.14	11.5.7	2020
macOS	10.13	11.5.3	2020
macOS	10.12	11.1.1	2019
macOS	10.11	10.1.6	2019
macOS	10.9 - 10.10	8.5.10	2018
macOS	10.8	7.1.1	2015
macOS	10.7	6.0.2	2013
macOS	10.6	5.0.5	2014
macOS	10.5	3.1.4	2012
macOS	10.4	2.0.8	2010

== Version history ==
Legend
Color	Meaning
Red	Unsupported release
Green	Current or still supported release

Version	Release date	Significant changes
1.0	August 6, 2007	First release (following 4 betas).
1.1.0	November 12, 2007	Support for Leopard, Boot Camp, and improvements to DirectX support and Unity.
1.1.1	January 24, 2008	Various bug fixes.
1.1.2	April 23, 2008	Support for Time Machine and various bug fixes.
1.1.3	May 30, 2008	Various bug fixes.
2.0	September 12, 2008	Multiple Snapshots with AutoProtect, Improved Unity, DirectX 9.0 Shader Model 2 3D, and support for Mac OS X Server guests.
2.0.1	November 14, 2008	Various bug fixes.
2.0.2	February 11, 2009	Import from Parallels, supports Mac OS X Server 10.5.6 host, mounts DMG images, supports Ubuntu 8.10 in Unity mode.
2.0.3	April 2, 2009	Various bug fixes. Adds experimental support for Snow Leopard Developer Builds.
2.0.4	April 9, 2009	Fixed Host code execution vulnerability.
2.0.5	June 23, 2009	Support for Nehalem Mac Pro. Experimental support for Mac OS X 10.6 as guest. Support for Ubuntu 9.04 as guest. Various bug fixes.
2.0.6	October 1, 2009	Fixed issues when running on Snow Leopard. Fixed issues with NVidia graphics cards on Mac OS X 10.6. Various bug fixes.
2.0.7	April 8, 2010	Fixed security issues, accepts VMware Fusion 3 license keys.
2.0.8	December 2, 2010	Maintenance release fixing Common Vulnerabilities and Exposures project (cve.mitre.org) issue CVE-2010-4297.
3.0	October 27, 2009	Added support for Windows 7 with Aero. Full 64‑bit compatibility with Mac OS X 10.6 host and guest. DirectX 9.0 Shader Model 3 3D. WDDM-compatible display driver.
3.0.1	December 10, 2009	Improved 3D & video performance, full support for Ubuntu 9.10 (Karmic Koala), 64‑bit networking subsystem, improved VMware Importer, improved VM resume times.
3.0.2	February 18, 2010	Fixes a problem so that the latest release of Mac OS X 10.6 Server (Snow Leopard) can run in a virtual machine.
3.1.0	May 25, 2010	Improved 3D & video performance, improved Unity view performance and integration, USB EasyConnect, improved migration assistant, 8‑core SMP support, increased virtual hard disk size, updated operating system support.
3.1.1	August 12, 2010	Various bug fixes. VMware vSphere 4.1 is now supported as a guest operating system.
3.1.2	December 2, 2010	Fixes various bugs and security issues.
3.1.3	May 31, 2011	Fixes various bugs and security issues.
3.1.4	April 13, 2012	Fixes a bug with starting virtual machines on OS X 10.7.4.
4.0	September 14, 2011	Run Lion, Lion Server, Snow Leopard, Snow Leopard Server, and Leopard Server in virtual machines, up to 2.5x faster 3D graphics, add Windows programs to Launchpad, view in full screen, or in Mission Control.
4.0.1	September 14, 2011	Contains an update that ensures that disk buffering is enabled when set to automatic.
4.0.2	September 27, 2011	Addresses an issue starting virtual machines running a forthcoming version of Mac OS X Lion.
4.1.0	November 17, 2011	Added support for Lion's full screen mode, improved performance, and reintroduced the ability to turn on virtual machines automatically when VMware Fusion is opened.
4.1.1	November 23, 2011	Reintroduces the Mac OS X Server check after it was inadvertently omitted from 4.1.0.
4.1.2	April 12, 2012	Adds early host and guest support in preparation for the future release of OS X Mountain Lion.
4.1.3	June 13, 2012	Various bug fixes
4.1.4	November 8, 2012	Various bug fixes
5.0.0	August 23, 2012	VMware Fusion 5 has been revamped to take advantage of new technologies only available in Mountain Lion, Windows 8 and the latest Macs
5.0.1	August 30, 2012	Improved handling of USB devices
5.0.2	November 8, 2012	Various bug fixes
5.0.3	March 14, 2013	Various bug fixes
5.0.4	December 11, 2013	Various bug fixes
5.0.5	July 3, 2014	VMware Fusion 5.0.5 has been updated to the OPENSSL library version openssl- 0.9.8za where necessary to address CVE-2014-0224, CVE-2014-0198, CVE-2010-5298, and CVE-2014-3470.
6.0.0	September 3, 2013	
6.0.1	September 19, 2013	
6.0.2	November 5, 2013	
6.0.3	April 17, 2014	Maintenance release which resolved some known issues
6.0.4	July 1, 2014	VMware Fusion 6.0.4 has been updated to the OPENSSL library version openssl-1.0.1h where necessary to address CVE-2014-0224, CVE-2014-0198, CVE-2010-5298, and CVE-2014-3470.
6.0.5	October 16, 2014	VMware Fusion 6.0.5 is a maintenance release that resolves some known issues
6.0.6	April 23, 2015	VMware Fusion 6.0.6 is a maintenance release that resolves some known issues
7.0.0	September 3, 2014	OS X Yosemite look and feel, support of Yosemite and Windows 8.1, optimized for Haswell Intel processors with performance improvements of up to 43% vs Fusion 6, allocate up to 2 Gb of video memory per virtual machine, improved support for Retina Macs® connected to non-Retina displays, energy impact reduced by 42%, automate GPU switching for dual GPU Macs, virtual web camera compatible with iSight and external webcams, improved guest OS compatibility, over 50 new features.
7.1.1	February 17, 2015	
7.1.2	June 15, 2015	VMware Fusion 7.1.2 has been updated to use OpenSSL library version openssl-1.0.1m which addresses several OpenSSL security issues
7.1.3	November 12, 2015	Maintenance release
8.0	August 24, 2015	OS X 10.11 El Capitan support for both host and guest OS; Windows 10 support for guest OS. New support for Ubuntu 15.04, Fedora 22, CentOS 7.1, RHEL 7.1, Oracle Linux 7.1, VMware Project Photon. Graphics support updated for DirectX10 and OpenGL 3.3. Improvements for encrypted virtual machines. Improved resolution settings. VMware vCloud Air Integration (Fusion 8 Pro only). Improved remote experience (Fusion 8 Pro only). Support IPv6 NAT network (Fusion 8 Pro only). Support the retina Macs, including iMac 5k and 12" MacBook. Echo cancellation for voice and video calls with Microsoft Lync and Skype. USB 3 support for Windows 7 VM's. Improved Start menu. Improved new VM creator.
8.0.1	October 1, 2015	Maintenance Release. Fixes an issue involving installing El Capitan as a guest OS.
8.0.2	October 29, 2015	Maintenance Release. Fixes issues with virtual machines crashing, and other compatibility fixes.
8.1	December 8, 2015	Maintenance Release. Fixes issues with Windows 10 easy installation and other compatibility improvements.
8.1.1	April 21, 2016	Maintenance Release. Fixes issues with nat and port forwarding and other compatibility improvements.
8.5	September 8, 2016	Maintenance Release. Full support for macOS Sierra, including Tabs and Siri support and Windows 10 Anniversary edition.
8.5.1	October 27, 2016	Maintenance Release. Fixes a hang/crash issue on Linux kernel 4.7 (and above), Intel-based hosts, as well as other issues.
8.5.2	November 13, 2016	Maintenance Release. Addresses an out-of-bounds memory access vulnerability related to the drag-and-drop feature. This may allow a guest to execute code on the operating system that runs VMware Fusion. The Common Vulnerabilities and Exposures project has assigned the identifier CVE-2016-7461 to this issue.
8.5.3	November 29, 2016	Maintenance Release. Addresses an issue that could cause Fusion on mac OS 10.12 to encounter an error.
8.5.4	March 9, 2017	Maintenance Release. It contains bug fixes, security updates, and performance improvements.
8.5.5	March 14, 2017	Maintenance Release. Addresses an out-of-bounds memory access vulnerability related to the drag-and-drop feature. This vulnerability might allow a guest to execute code on the operating system that runs VMware Fusion. The Common Vulnerabilities and Exposures project assigned the identifier CVE-2017-4901 to this issue.
8.5.6	March 28, 2017	Maintenance Release. It contains bug fixes and security updates.
8.5.7	May 18, 2017	Maintenance Release. Day 0 support of the Windows 10 Creators Update (version 1703) as a guest operating system and contains bug fixes and security updates.
8.5.8	June 22, 2017	Maintenance Release. It contains bug fixes and security updates.
8.5.9	November 16, 2017	Maintenance Release. It contains bug fixes and security updates.
8.5.10	January 9, 2018	Maintenance Release. This update of VMware Fusion exposes hardware support for branch target injection mitigation to VMware guests. This hardware is used by some guest operating systems to mitigate CVE-2018-5715 (also called by the name "Spectre").
10.0	September 26, 2017	In addition to supporting macOS 10.13 High Sierra as both Host and Guest, Fusion 10 supports Windows 10 Fall Creators Update and the latest updates for Server 2016.
10.1.0	December 21, 2017	Improved guest support of Windows 10 Fall Creators Update (Version 1709) Includes VMware Tools 10.2.0
10.1.1	January 9, 2018	Maintenance Release. This update of VMware Fusion exposes hardware support for branch target injection mitigation to VMware guests. This hardware is used by some guest operating systems to mitigate CVE-2018-5715 (also called by the name "Spectre").
10.1.2	May 21, 2018	Maintenance Release. It contains bug fixes and security updates.
10.1.3	August 14, 2018	Maintenance Release. It contains bug fixes and security updates.
10.1.4	November 9, 2018	Maintenance Release. It contains bug fixes and security updates.
10.1.5	November 22, 2018	Maintenance Release. It contains bug fixes and security updates.
10.1.6	March 28, 2019	Maintenance Release. It contains bug fixes and security updates.
11.0	September 25, 2018	In addition to supporting macOS 10.14 Mojave as both host and guest, Fusion 11 supports Windows 10 October 2018 Update and the latest updates for Server 2016. Other notable features include: Enhanced Metal Graphics Rendering Engine with Direct3D 10.1, updated user interface and application menu, improved Fusion REST API, one-click SSH, new vSphere view, VMware Virtual Hardware Platform version 16.
11.0.1	November 9, 2018	Maintenance Release. It contains bug fixes for a compatibility issue with other hypervisor software.
11.0.2	November 22, 2018	Maintenance Release. Improves support for Windows 10 October 2018 Update (version 1809)
11.0.3	March 28, 2019	Maintenance Release. It contains bug fixes and security updates.
11.1.0	May 14, 2019	Maintenance Release. Contains bug fixes and security updates, added support for Windows 10 19H1 Ubuntu 19.04 RHEL 8.0 Fedora 30 ESXi 6.7 U2.
11.1.1	August 8, 2019	Maintenance Release. Mitigates a virtual machine performance issue.
11.5	September 16, 2019	Support for Dark Mode, Sidecar, and more.
11.5.1	November 12, 2019	Several security fixes.
11.5.2	March 12, 2020	Security and bug fixes.
11.5.3	March 24, 2020	Patches a privilege escalation vulnerability.
11.5.5	May 28, 2020	Added support for containers and more guest OSs and implemented performance improvements and security fixes.
11.5.6	August 6, 2020	Resolved bug fixes.
11.5.7	November 19, 2020	Performance improvements, bug fixes and security updates.
12	September 4, 2020	VMware Fusion Player is introduced. Similar to its Workstation counterpart, VMware Workstation Player, it is released for free for non-commercial use. Fusion 12 adds support for macOS Big Sur, DirectX 11 and OpenGL 4.1, an external GPU, USB 3.1, and more. Security fixes were also introduced.
12.1.0	November 19, 2020	Optimized for macOS 11 Big Sur as host and guest (macOS 10.15 Catalina is also supported as host). New guest operating system support, such as Windows 10 20H2, Ubuntu 20.10, RHEL 8.3, and Fedora 33. Fusion health check. Includes docker-machine-driver-vmware. Performance improvements, bug fixes and security updates.
12.1.1	April 1, 2021	Security updates.
12.1.2	May 18, 2021	Security updates. Updates VMware Tools to version 11.2.6.
12.2.0	Oct 14, 2021	Security updates and bug fixes related to networking. Drops support for macOS 10.15 Catalina hosts.
12.2.1	Nov 9, 2021	Bug fixes for the compatible product list.
12.2.3	Mar 10, 2022	Bug fixes for Fusion Unity view.
12.2.4	Jul 21, 2022	Bug fixes for mass deployment.
12.2.5	Dec 13, 2022	Security updates.
13.0	Nov 17, 2022	Optimized for macOS 13 Ventura as host and guest. Adds official support for Apple Silicon Macs. Adds support for TPM 2.0 and OpenGL 4.3.
13.0.1	Feb 2, 2023	Bug fixes for importing Boot Camp partitions, missing localizations and network issues on Monterey/Ventura hosts/guests.
13.0.2	Apr 25, 2023	Security updates.
13.5 (Build 22583790)	Oct 19, 2023	New Security Enhancement Download and Install Windows 11 guest operating system on an Apple Silicon Mac Import and Export Virtual Machines with vTPM device Manage Power Operations of Encrypted Virtual Machines using VMREST API VMware Hardware Version 21
13.5.2 (Build 23775688)	May 14, 2024	As of this version, Workstation Pro and Fusion Pro are free for personal use.
13.6.0 (Build 24238079)	Sep 3, 2024	Added vmcli command line tool, new host and client operating system support, and security updates.
25H2 (Build 24995814)	Oct 14, 2025	Introducing dictTool. Added support for USB 3.2. Added support for virtual hardware version 22. Added support for new guest operating systems. Added support for new host operating systems - macOS Tahoe (Intel and Apple Silicon).

== See also ==
- Desktop virtualization
- Hardware virtualization
- VMware Workstation
- VMware Workstation Player
