= Microsoft Virtual Server =

Hypervisor for Microsoft Windows

- Original author: Connectix
- Developer: Microsoft
- Release: September 13, 2004; 21 years ago
- Final release: Virtual Server 2005 R2 SP1 / June 11, 2007; 19 years ago
- Operating system: Windows XP, Windows Server 2003, Windows Vista
- Successor: Hyper-V
- Type: Hypervisor
- License: Freeware
- Website: www.microsoft.com/virtualserver/

Microsoft Virtual Server is a discontinued virtualization solution that facilitated the creation of virtual machines on the Windows XP, Windows Vista and Windows Server 2003 operating systems. Originally developed by Connectix, it was acquired by Microsoft prior to release. Virtual PC is Microsoft's related desktop virtualization software package.

Virtual machines are created and managed through a Web-based interface that relies on Internet Information Services (IIS) or through a Windows client application tool called VMRCplus.

The last version using this name was Microsoft Virtual Server 2005 R2 SP1. New features in R2 SP1 include Linux guest operating system support, Virtual Disk Precompactor, SMP (but not for the guest OS), x64 host operating system support, the ability to mount virtual hard drives on the host machine and additional operating systems support, including Windows Vista. It also provides a Volume Shadow Copy writer that enables live backups of the Guest OS on a Windows Server 2003 or Windows Server 2008 host. A utility to mount VHD images has also been included since SP1. Virtual Machine Additions for Linux are available as a free download. Officially supported Linux guest operating systems include Red Hat Enterprise Linux versions 2.1-5.0, Red Hat Linux 9.0, SUSE Linux and SUSE Linux Enterprise Server versions 9 and 10.

Virtual Server has been succeeded by Hyper-V.

== Differences from Virtual PC ==
- VPC has multimedia support and Virtual Server does not (e.g. no sound driver support).
- VPC uses a single thread whereas Virtual Server is multi-threaded.
- VPC will install on Windows 7, but Virtual Server is restricted from install on NT 6.1 or higher operating systems i.e. Server 2008 R2 and Windows 7.
- VPC is limited to 127GB .vhd (per IDE CHS specification), however Virtual Server can be made to access .vhd up to 2048GB (NTFS max file size).

== Version history ==
Microsoft acquired an unreleased Virtual Server from Connectix in February 2003. The initial release of Microsoft's Virtual Server, general availability, was announced on September 13, 2004. Virtual Server 2005 was available in two editions: Standard and Enterprise. The Standard edition was limited to a maximum 4 processors for the host operating system while the Enterprise edition was not.

On 2006-04-03, Microsoft made Virtual Server 2005 R2 Enterprise Edition a free download, in order to better compete with the free virtualization offerings from VMware and Xen, and discontinued the Standard Edition. Microsoft Virtual Server R2 SP1 added support for both Intel VT (IVT) and AMD Virtualization (AMD-V).

== Limitations ==
Known limitations of Virtual Server, as of September 2007, include the following:

- Will not install on Windows 7 and Server 2008 R2 or newer operating systems. Upgrades from Vista/Server2008 can be patched.
- Although Virtual Server 2005 R2 can run on hosts with x86-64 processors, it cannot run x64 guests that require x86-64 processors (guests cannot be 64-bit).
- It also makes use of SMP, but does not virtualize it (it does not allow guests to use more than 1 CPU each).
- Performance may suffer due to the way the instruction set is virtualized in this platform, with very limited direct interaction with the host hardware.

== See also ==
- Virtual appliance
- Virtual disk image
- x86 virtualization
