= SUSE Studio =

Operating system build service

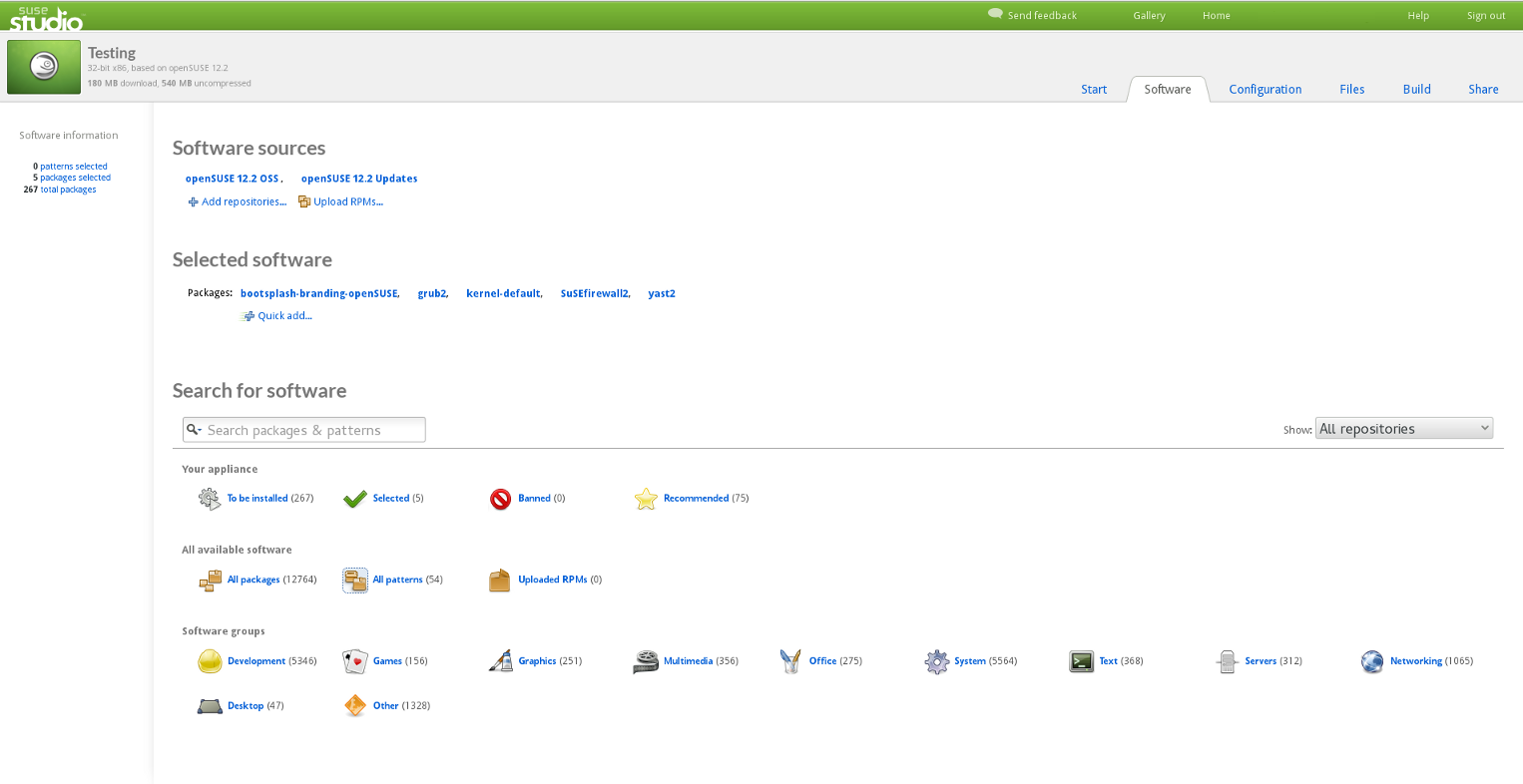
- The SUSE Studio page for editing an appliance
- Website type: Operating system build service
- Dissolved: February 15, 2018; 8 years ago
- Owner: SUSE
- Website: susestudio.com at the Wayback Machine (archived 2015-07-07)
- Commercial: No
- Registration: Optional (required to build and download appliances)
- Current status: Offline
- Written in: HTML and Flash

SUSE Studio was an online Linux software creation tool by SUSE. Users could develop their own Linux distro, software appliance, or virtual appliance, mainly choosing which applications and packages they want on their "custom" Linux and how it looks.

Users could choose between openSUSE or SUSE Linux Enterprise as a base and pick from a variety of pre-configured images including jeOS, minimal server, GNOME, and KDE desktops.

The SUSE Studio service was shut down on February 15, 2018.

== Image formats and booting options ==
SUSE Studio supports the following image formats and booting options:

- Live CD/DVD / ISO image
- VMDK (VMware disk image)
- VirtualBox
- VHD (Virtual Hard Disk)
- [Hard] disk image
- USB image
- Xen
- KVM (Kernel-based Virtual Machine)
- OVF (Open Virtualization Format)
- AMI (Amazon Machine Image) for Amazon Elastic Compute Cloud
- Preboot Execution Environment (onsite version only)

== SUSE Studio in use ==
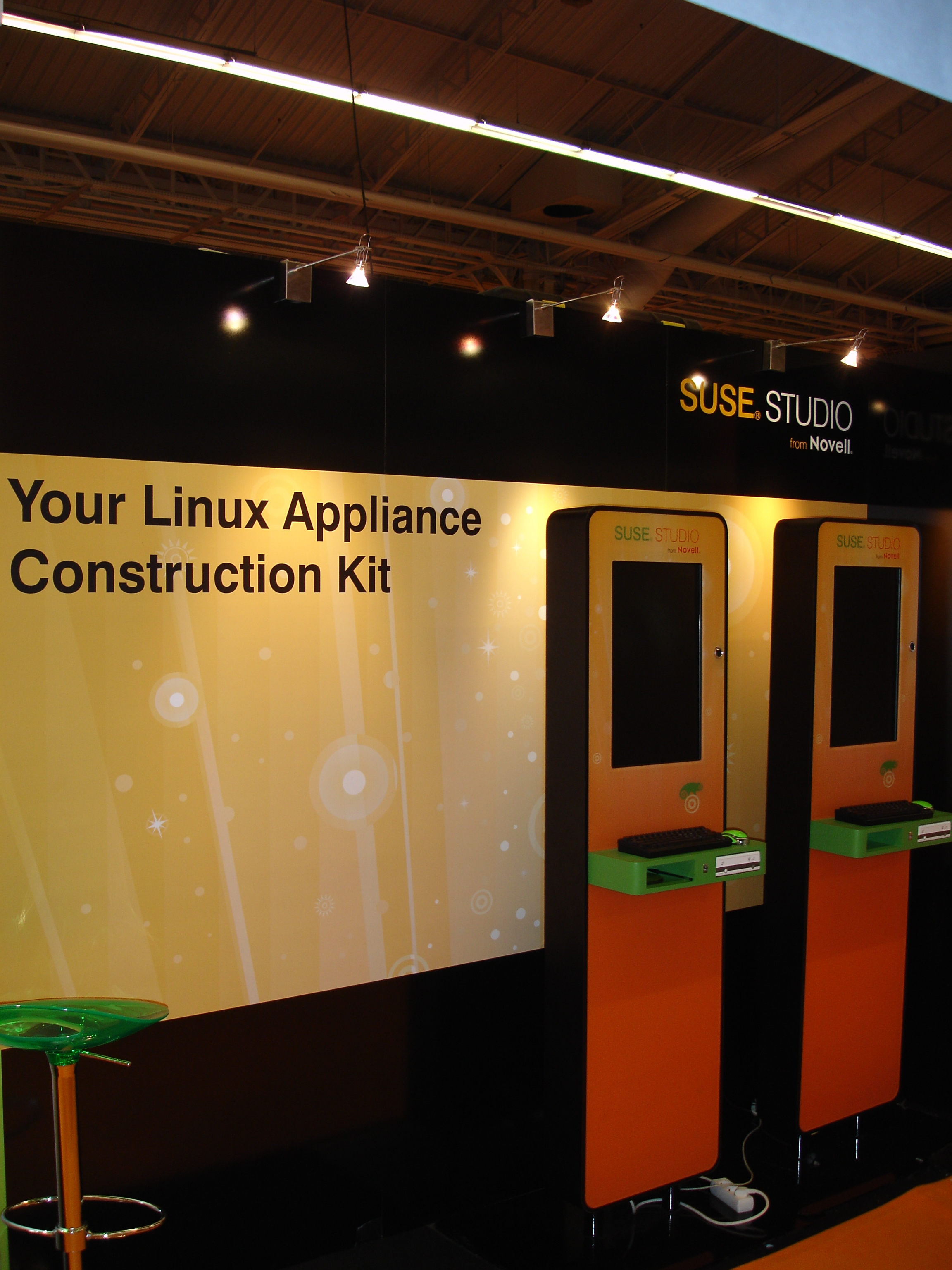
SUSE Studio demonstration booth at Solutions Linux 2009 show in Paris

On SUSE Gallery one can find a catalog of the images created in SUSE Studio. These are available for download as well as immediate deployment on the supported cloud platforms. Upon logging in, cloning and test-driving images is possible.

A number of projects, both related to the openSUSE Project and independent, use SUSE Gallery as the preferred way to get virtual- and disk images to their users.

SUSE Studio is what powered the fan-made ChromeOS, which was a semi-stripped-down system loaded with the developers' version of Google Chrome, Google web application links, and OpenOffice.org (not to be confused with Google's "ChromeOS").

The many desktop environments supported (not limited to):

- brltty
  - JeOS
  - Server
- Qt only
  - LXQt
- GTK+ only
  - GNOME
    - Cinnamon
    - MATE
  - XFCE
  - Enlightenment
- Qt and GTK+ integrated
  - KDE

== Shutdown ==
On November 9, 2017, OpenSUSE announced that they would be shutting down SUSE Studio Online on February 15, 2018. SUSE Studio Express will replace the service, because of previous merging with Open Build Service and SUSE Studio Online.

== See also ==
- Open Build Service (formerly openSUSE Build Service)
- openSUSE Project
- SUSE Linux
- SUSE Studio ImageWriter
- YaST
- ZYpp
