= Ubuntu JeOS =

- Ubuntu logo

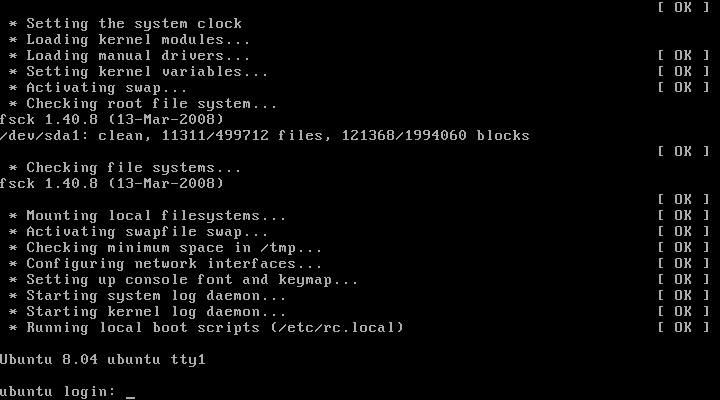
- Ubuntu JeOS 8.04
- Developer: Canonical Ltd.; Ubuntu Foundation
- OS family: Unix-like: Linux
- Working state: Discontinued
- Source model: Open source
- Latest release: Part of Ubuntu 12.10 (Quantal Quetzal) / October 18, 2012; 14 years ago
- Available in: Multilingual
- Update method: APT
- Package manager: dpkg
- Supported platforms: IA-32, x86-64, LPIA, SPARC, PowerPC, ARM, IA-64
- Kernel type: Monolithic: Linux
- Default user interface: Command-line only, GUIs available through repository
- License: Free software, mainly GPL
- Official website: www.ubuntu.com/server/features/virtualisation

Ubuntu JeOS (acronym pronounced "juice"; short for just enough operating system) is a discontinued variant of Ubuntu Linux that is described as "an efficient variant ... configured specifically for virtual appliances." It is a concept for what an operating system should look like in the context of a virtual appliance. JeOS has been replaced by Ubuntu Core, which is now an officially supported minimal variant of Ubuntu.

Its first release was Ubuntu JeOS 7.10, and since the release of Ubuntu 8.10 it has been included as an option as part of the standard Ubuntu Server Edition.

== Supported platforms ==
The latest version of JeOS is optimized for virtualization technologies by VMware, Inc., and the Linux Kernel-based Virtual Machine.

== Specifications ==
Specifications for version 8.10 and above include:

- Part of the standard Ubuntu Server ISO image
- Less than 380 MB installed size
- Specialized server kernel
- Intended for VMware ESX, VMware Server, libvirt and Kernel-based Virtual Machine (KVM)
- 128 MB minimum memory
- No graphical environment preloaded

== See also ==
- SUSE Linux Enterprise JeOS
- OpenSolaris JeOS
- List of Ubuntu-based distributions
