= OVF =

OVF may refer to:

- Open Virtualization Format, an open standard for packaging and distributing virtual appliances
- Optical viewfinder
- Orange Volunteer Force, an Ulster loyalist paramilitary group in Northern Ireland
