= LibreELEC =

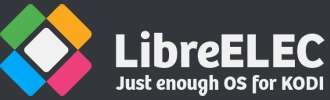

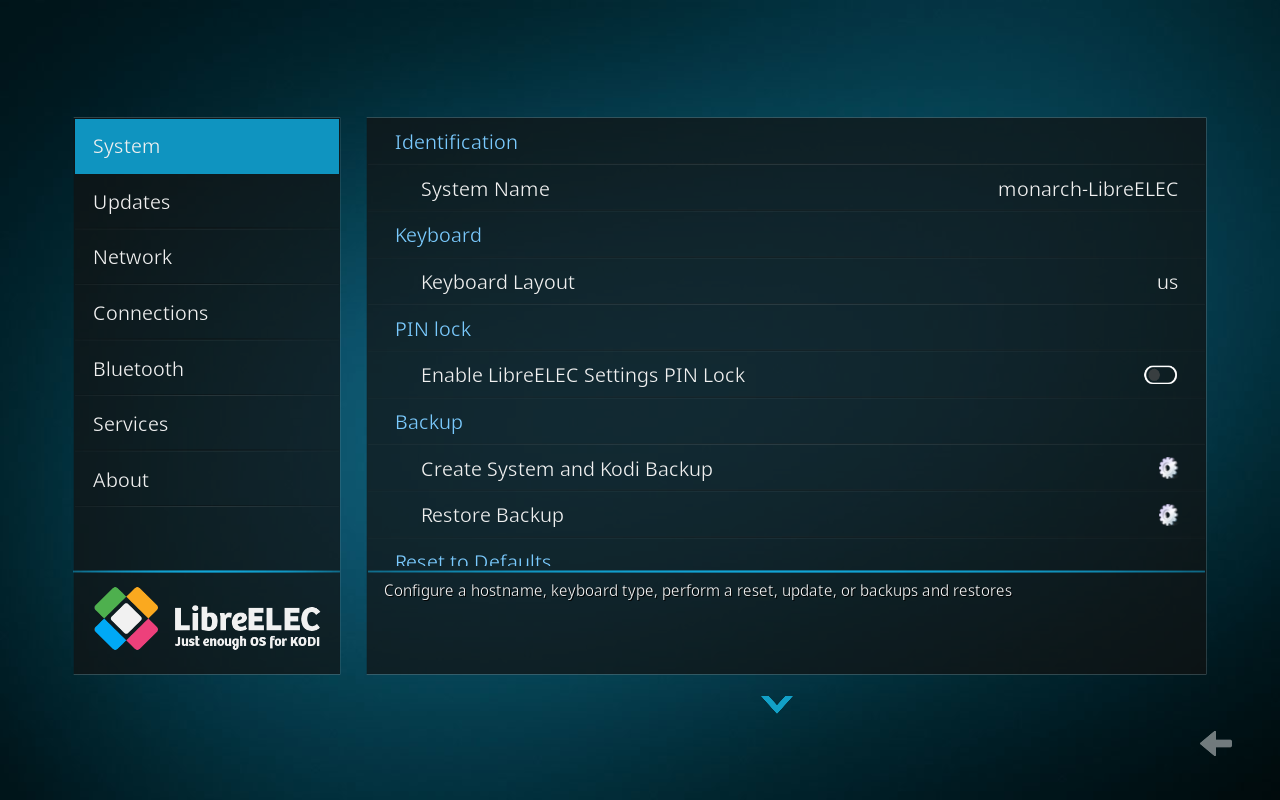
- LibreELEC settings Add-On in KODI
- Developer: LibreELEC Team
- OS family: Linux (Unix-like)
- Working state: Current
- Source model: Open source
- Initial release: 4 April 2016; 10 years ago
- Latest release: 12.2 / 15 August 2025; 14 months ago
- Repository: github.com/LibreELEC/LibreELEC.tv
- Update method: Automatic
- Supported platforms: AMD64; ARMhf, ARMv7, ARM64
- Kernel type: Linux
- Default user interface: Kodi
- License: GPLv2
- Official website: libreelec.tv

LibreELEC (short for Libre Embedded Linux Entertainment Center) is an up-to-date non-profit and fully open-source fork of the (now discontinued) OpenELEC as an up-to-date Just enough operating system. It acts as a Linux-based all-in-one Home theater PC (HTPC) distribution for the Kodi media center application software appliance and entertainment system.

The initial fork of OpenELEC was first announced in March 2016 as a split from the OpenELEC team after "creative differences", taking most of its active developers at the time to join the new LibreELEC project. This is a conservative fork of the OpenELEC project with a stronger focus on pre-release testing and post-release change management for more stable setup and environment.

== History ==
Because of the end of Python 2 support in 2020, LibreELEC version 10 with Kodi 19 switches to Python 3. Therefore, addons created for prior versions with python 2 need to be updated by developers for Kodi 19 because Python code is not backward compatible.

LibreELEC version	Release date	Kodi version		Kernel	Announcement
7.0.0	4 April 2016	16.1	Jarvis		LibreELEC (Jarvis) v7.0.0 RELEASE
8.0.0	22 February 2017	17.0	Krypton		LibreELEC (Krypton) v8.0.0 RELEASE
8.0.1	24 March 2017	17.1	Krypton		LibreELEC (Krypton) v8.0.1 MR
8.0.2	26 May 2017	17.3	Krypton		LibreELEC (Krypton) v8.0.2 MR
8.2.0	28 October 2017	17.5	Krypton	4.11.8	LibreELEC (Krypton) v8.2.0 RELEASE
8.2.1	21 November 2017	17.6	Krypton		LibreELEC (Krypton) v8.2.1 MR
8.2.2	23 December 2017	17.6	Krypton		LibreELEC (Krypton) 8.2.2 MR
8.2.3	21 January 2018	17.6	Krypton		LibreELEC (Krypton) 8.2.3 MR
8.2.4	14 March 2018	17.6	Krypton	4.9.59	LibreELEC (Krypton) 8.2.4 MR
8.2.5	14 April 2018	17.6	Krypton	4.9.80	LibreELEC (Krypton) 8.2.5 MR
9.0.0	2 February 2019	18.0	Leia		LibreELEC (Leia) 9.0.0 RELEASE
9.0.1	26 February 2019	18.1	Leia	4.19.23	LibreELEC (Leia) 9.0.1 MR
9.0.2	11 May 2019	18.2	Leia	4.19.36	LibreELEC (Leia) 9.0.2 MR
9.2	22 November 2019	18.5	Leia	4.19.83	LibreELEC (Leia) 9.2
9.2.1	10 March 2020	18.6	Leia	4.19/5.1	LibreELEC (Leia) 9.2.1
9.2.2	28 March 2020	18.6	Leia		LibreELEC (Leia) 9.2.2 Hotfix
9.2.3	4 June 2020	18.7.1	Leia	4.19/5.1	LibreELEC (Leia) 9.2.3
9.2.4	12 August 2020	18.8	Leia		LibreELEC (Leia) 9.2.4
9.2.5	24 August 2020	18.8	Leia		LibreELEC (Leia) 9.2.5
9.2.6	2 November 2020	18.9	Leia		LibreELEC (Leia) 9.2.6
10.0.0	26 August 2021	19.1	Matrix	5.4	LibreELEC (Matrix) 10.0.0
10.0.1	3 November 2021	19.3	Matrix	5.10	LibreELEC (Matrix) 10.0.1
10.0.2	9 March 2022	19.4	Matrix		LibreELEC (Matrix) 10.0.2
10.0.3	17 October 2022	19.4	Matrix		LibreELEC (Matrix) 10.0.3
10.0.4	15 January 2023	19.5	Matrix		LibreELEC (Matrix) 10.0.4
11.0	6 March 2023	20.0	Nexus		LibreELEC (Nexus) 11.0
11.0.1	24 March 2023	20.1	Nexus	6.1.19	LibreELEC (Nexus) 11.0.1
11.0.3	20 July 2023	20.2	Nexus	6.1.38	LibreELEC (Nexus) 11.0.3
11.0.4	23 December 2023	20.2	Nexus	6.1.68	LibreELEC (Nexus) 11.0.4
12.0	01 May 2024	21.0	Omega	6.6.28	LibreELEC (Omega) 12.0
12.0.1	26 August 2024	21.1	Omega	6.6.46	LibreELEC (Omega) 12.0.1
12.0.2	22 January 2025	21.2	Omega	6.6.71	LibreELEC (Omega) 12.0.2
12.2	15 August 2025	21.2+	Omega	6.16.12 (RPi2-5 6.12.56)	LibreELEC (Omega) 12.2
12.2.1	03 November 2025	21.3	Omega	6.16.12 (RPi2-5 6.12.56)	LibreELEC (Omega) 12.2.1
