= Turnkey (disambiguation) =

A turnkey project is constructed by a developer and sold or turned over to a buyer in a ready to use condition. See also turnkey supplier.

Turnkey may also refer to:

- TurnKey Linux Virtual Appliance Library, an open source project.
- Prison officer
