= Bitnami =

Library of software packages

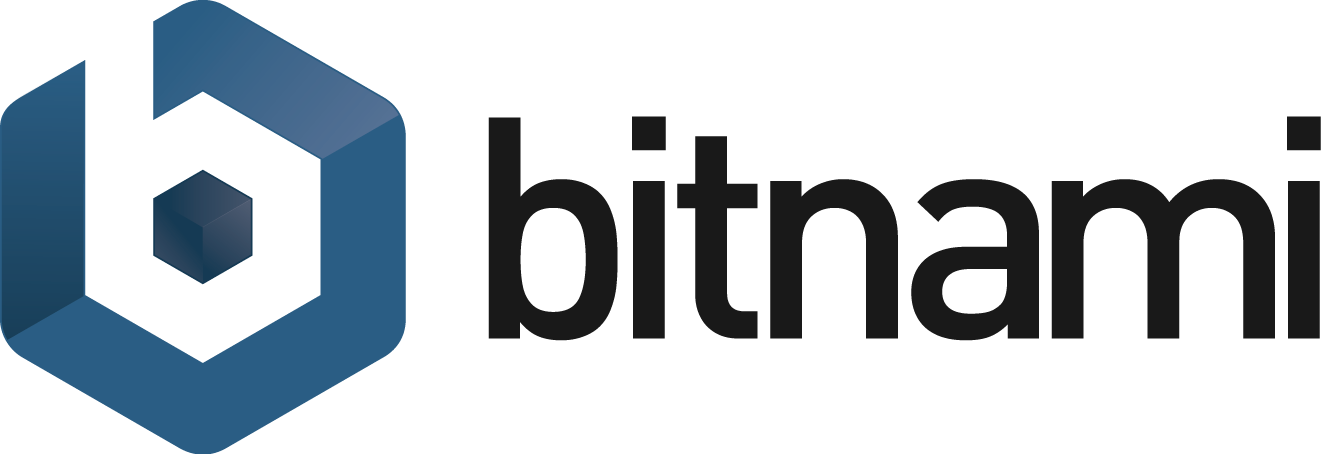
- Developer: Bitrock Inc.
- Type: Package management system
- License: Apache License 2.0
- Website: bitnami.com

Bitnami is a library of installers or software packages for web applications and software stacks as well as virtual appliances. Bitnami is sponsored by Bitrock, a company founded in 2003 in Seville, Spain by Daniel Lopez Ridruejo and Erica Brescia. Bitnami stacks are used for installing software on Linux, Windows, macOS and Solaris. VMware acquired Bitrock, along with its two largest properties, Bitnami and InstallBuilder, on May 15, 2019.

== Technology overview ==
Bitnami stacks are available for web applications such as WordPress, Drupal, Joomla!, Redmine, AbanteCart, PrestaShop, Magento, MediaWiki and many others. In addition to the application itself, the stacks include the other software required to run that application. For example, a WordPress stack will include WordPress, as well as the MySQL database to manage data, Apache Web server to serve the pages, OpenSSL library for basic cryptographic functions and PhpMyAdmin to administer MySQL. Bitnami installers are released under the Apache License 2.0.

Using automated cloud computing management, Bitnami offers users automated application deployments of open source server apps from IBM Cloud, Oracle Cloud, Amazon EC2, Azure and Google Cloud Platform servers.

Since July 2009 Bitnami also offers ready-to-run virtual machines that contain a minimal and configured Linux operating system. Bitnami offers open source applications as modules for XAMPP package developed by Apache Friends.

The distinct difference between installation of Bitnami installers and native installs (e.g. rpms and debs on Linux) are that they are installed in a way as to prevent interference with existing software and libraries. If multiple applications are installed on the same web server considerations for resolving conflicts on specific ports must be made.

On February 13, 2009, Bitnami announced the release of the Enano CMS web stack, which is unique in that, according to Bitnami and to the Enano CMS Project, the stack module was the first to be externally developed.

In February 2010, Bitnami announced the release of Bitnami Cloud Hosting a service that allows deploying Bitnami stacks on the Amazon EC2 cloud, with automatic monitoring and backups.

Since 2019, Bitnami has been part of VMware. VMware announced its intent to acquire Bitnami and proceeded on May 15, 2019.

Broadcom indirectly acquired Bitnami through its acquisition of VMware, which was announced in 2022 and completed in late 2023. Following the acquisition, Broadcom transitioned Bitnami toward a commercial, enterprise-focused model, moving the free community container catalog to an unmaintained legacy repository while placing most actively maintained production images behind paid Bitnami Secure Images offerings by 2025.

== See also ==
- Software appliance
- Live CD
- TurnKey Linux Virtual Appliance Library
