= Linux-powered device =

Computer appliance using the Linux kernel

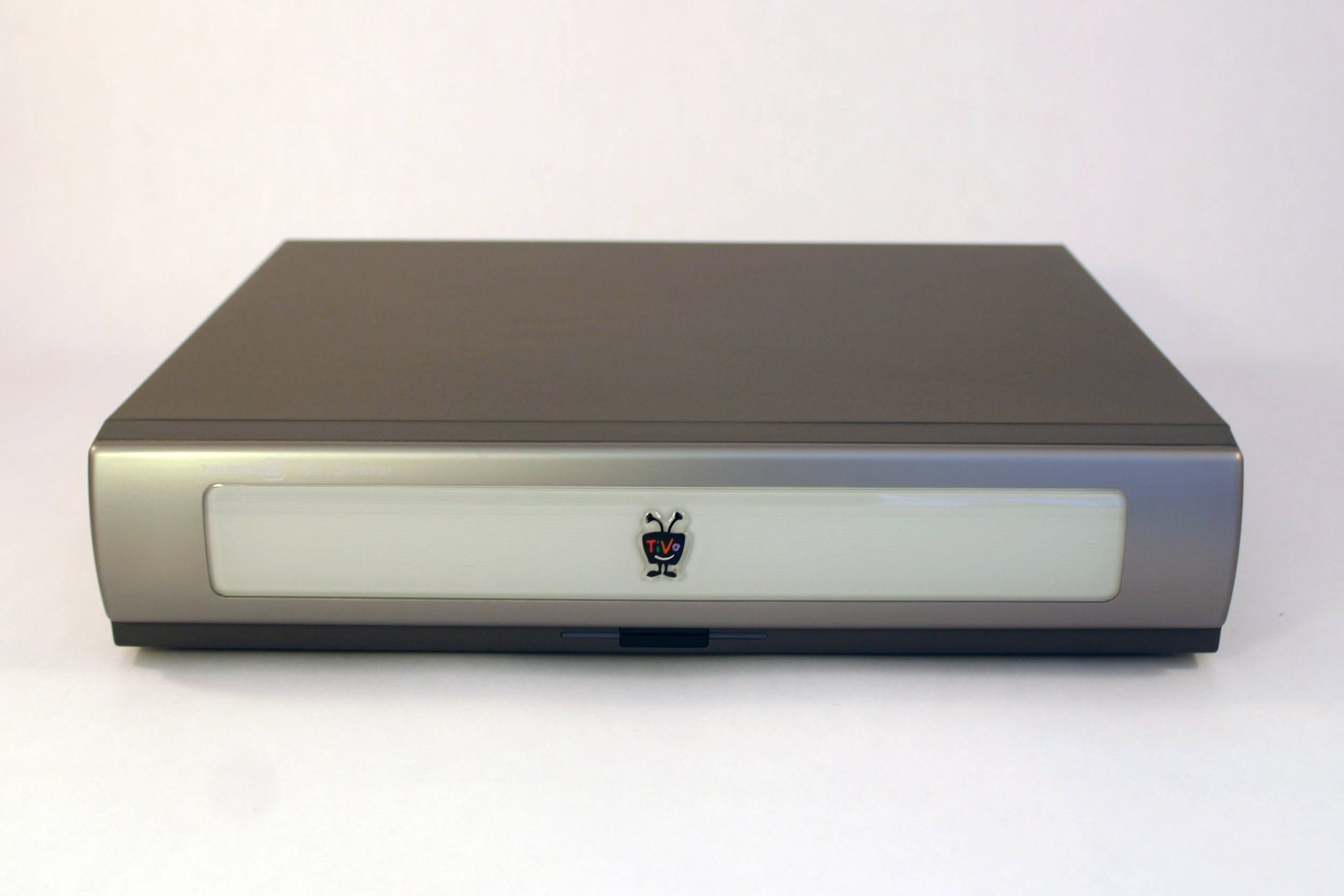
TiVo DVR, a consumer device running Linux

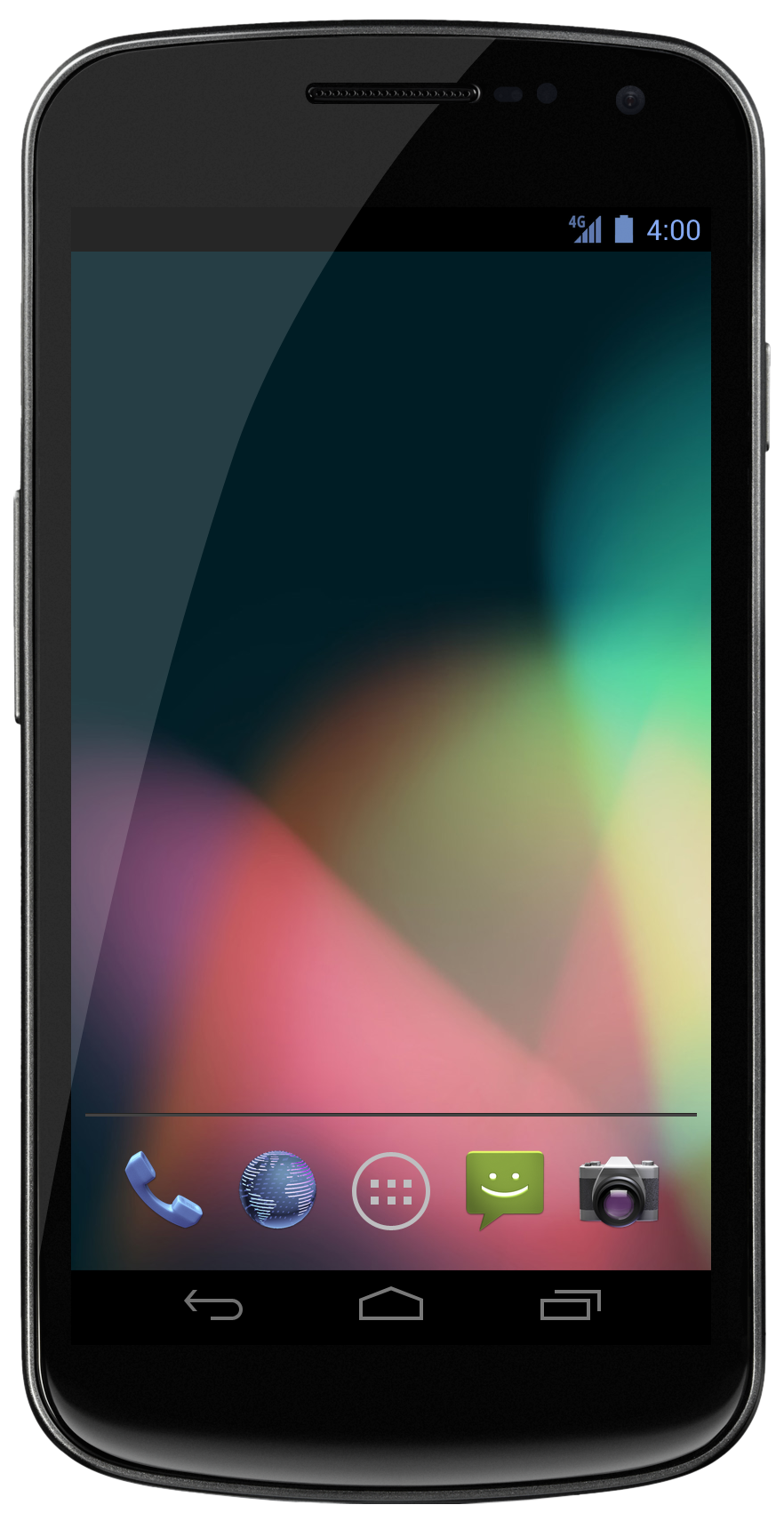
Galaxy Nexus, an Android smartphone (Android is based on the Linux kernel)

Linux-based devices or Linux devices are computer appliances that are powered by the Linux kernel and possibly parts of the GNU operating system. Device manufacturers' reasons to use Linux may be various: low cost, security, stability, scalability or customizability. Many original equipment manufacturers use free and open source software to brand their products. Community maintained Linux devices are also available.

== Community maintained devices ==
These devices were not intended to run Linux at the time of their production, but a community effort made possible either full or partial Linux support. Because of the open source philosophy that free and open source software brings to the software world, many people have ported the Linux kernel to run on devices other than a typical desktop, laptop or server computer. Some ports are performed by committed individuals or groups to provide alternative software on their favorite hardware. Examples include iPods, PlayStations, Xbox, TiVo, and WRT54G.

The original hardware vendors are in some cases supportive of these efforts (Linksys with the WRT54G) or at the least tolerate the use of such software by end users (see TiVo hacking). Others go to great lengths to try to stop these alternative implementations.

== Android ==
Android is a Linux-based operating system optimised for mobile touchscreen environments—smartphones, tablets, e-Books, and the like. Developed, published, and maintained by Google's Android Open Source Project (in consultation with the Open Handset Alliance), Android relieves smartphone manufacturers of the costs of developing- or licensing proprietary handset operating systems.

First unveiled in 2007, Android became the world's most widely deployed smartphone platform in Q4 2010. By September 2012, 500 million Android devices had been activated, with a further 1.3 million devices being activated per day. Google Nexus developer phones are the flagship brand of Android handsets, with features and capabilities that represent the state of the art at the time of launch (typically every eleven months).

== License violations ==
In most of these cases the OEMs are open about their use of such software and fulfil the requirements of their Free software licenses, such as the GNU General Public License (GPL), but in a small number of cases this use is masked, either deliberately or through professed ignorance or misunderstanding. Violators are usually found through public records, where they may be forced to declare their implementations, or through their own advertising, for example "Embedded Software Engineers with Mandatory Linux Experience Required" on their careers pages, and yet their site or product documentation offers no source download or offer to supply the software source as required by the license GPL.

Organizations such as gpl-violations.org, the Free Software Foundation (FSF) and the Software Freedom Law Center (SFLC) are now more organized at pursuing such violators and obtaining compliance. Usually, they seek voluntary compliance as a first step and only enter legal proceedings when blocked. When notified of violations they confirm them by asking the supplier, examining available product samples, or even going so far as to make blind purchases of the product through front companies.

== See also ==
- Linux on embedded systems
- Linux for mobile devices
- Open-design movement
- Open-source robotics
