= OpenELEC =

Linux distribution

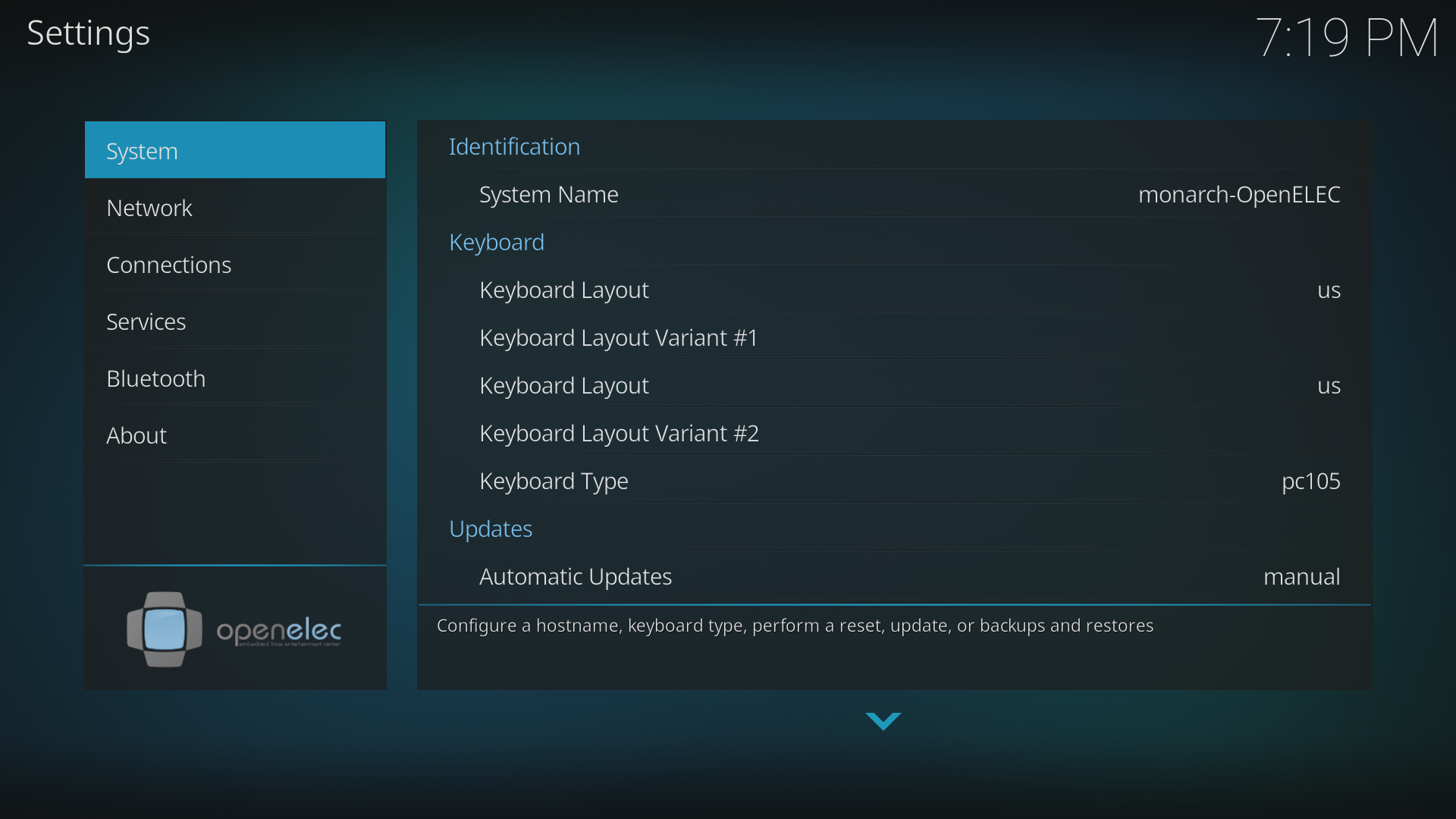
- LibreELEC settings Add-On in Kodi
- Developer: OpenELEC Team
- OS family: Linux (Unix-like)
- Working state: Discontinued
- Source model: Open source
- Initial release: 2009
- Latest release: 8.0.4 / 4 June 2017; 9 years ago
- Update method: Automatic
- Supported platforms: ARM, IA-32, x86-64
- Kernel type: Linux
- Default user interface: Kodi
- License: GNU GPL
- Succeeded by: LibreELEC
- Official website: openelec.tv

OpenELEC (short for Open Embedded Linux Entertainment Center) is a discontinued Linux distribution designed for home theater PCs and based on the Kodi (formerly XBMC) media center application.

OpenELEC applies the "just enough operating system" principle. It is designed to consume relatively few resources and to boot quickly from flash memory. OpenELEC disk images for the Raspberry Pi series and Freescale i.MX6 based devices are also available.

The OpenELEC team released OpenELEC 4.0 on 5 May 2014, and this version features updated XBMC 13.0 with further updated important parts of the operating system as well as the Linux kernel updated to version 3.14 and additional device drivers. OpenELEC 4.0 also switched its init system to systemd.

In March 2016, OpenELEC was forked after "creative differences", taking most of its active developers at the time to join the new LibreELEC project.

== Description ==
OpenELEC provides a media center software suite that comes with a pre-configured version of Kodi and third-party addons with retro video game console emulators and DVR plugins. OpenELEC is a small and fast-booting Linux based distribution, primarily designed to boot from flash memory cards such as CompactFlash or a solid-state drive, similar to that of the XBMCbuntu (formerly XBMC Live) distribution. However, it is specifically targeted to a minimum set-top box hardware setup based on an ARM SoCs or Intel x86 processor and graphics.

== History ==
Since 2011, the OpenELEC team usually releases a new major version, following the Kodi release schedule.

Since 2014, specific builds supporting a set of Graphics/GPU chipsets (ION, Fusion, Intel,...) are deprecated. And since version 6, x86 builds are deprecated too. Builds are currently available for x86-64 systems (as "Generic Build"), Raspberry Pi, Raspberry Pi 2, Raspberry Pi 3 and the first generation Apple TV.

OpenELEC version		Release date	Kodi version		Kernel
1	1.0	20 October 2011	10.1	Dharma	
2	2.0	16 October 2012	11.0	Eden	3.2.31
3	3.0	24 March 2013	12.1	Frodo	
3	3.0.6	15 June 2013	12.1	Frodo	
3	3.2	13 September 2013	12.2	Frodo	3.10
3	3.2.4	28 November 2013	12.2	Frodo	3.10.20
4	4.0	5 May 2014	13.0	Gotham	3.14
4	4.0.7	9 July 2014	13.1	Gotham	3.14.11
4	4.2	26 September 2014	13.2	Gotham	3.16
5	5.0	28 December 2014	14.0	Helix	3.17
5	5.0.7	29 March 2015	14.2	Helix	3.17
6	6.0	1 November 2015	15.2	Isengard	4.1
6	6.0.3	1 March 2016	15.2	Isengard	4.1
7	7.0	29 December 2016	16.1	Jarvis	4.4
7	7.0.1	12 January 2017	16.1	Jarvis	4.4
8	8.0	9 April 2017	17.1	Krypton	4.9

== Systems ==
On 5 February 2013, OpenELEC announced that they had jointly developed, with Arctic, a manufacturer of computer cooling systems based in Switzerland, a passively cooled entertainment system – the MC001 media centre, based on the Kodi 12 (OpenELEC 3.0) platform. They also announced plans to provide further builds for the ARCTIC MC001 systems on their next release.

Pulse-Eight sells both custom and off the shelf hardware products primarily designed for Kodi, such as remote controls, HTPC systems and accessories, including a HTPC PVR set-top-box pre-installed with Kodi that they call "PulseBox" Pulse-Eight also offers free performance tuned embedded versions of Kodi that they call Pulse, which is based on OpenELEC and a custom PVR-build of Kodi meant to run on dedicated HTPC systems.

Xtreamer Ultra and Xtreamer Ultra 2, manufactured by the South Korean company Unicorn Information Systems, are nettops based on Nvidia graphics and Intel Atom processors and pre-installed OpenELEC and Kodi software. The first-generation Xtreamer Ultra uses Nvidia Ion chipset with a 1.80 GHz Dual-Core Intel Atom D525 CPU, while the Xtreamer Ultra 2 uses discrete GeForce GT 520M graphics with a 2.13 GHz Dual-Core Intel Atom D2700 CPU.

== Receptions ==
Dedoimedo reviewed OpenELEC in 2014:

If you think your investment in the Pi and openELEC is worth the difference in price toward a fully featured smart TV or a home media center, then you should definitely spend more time tweaking and taming this little box. As far as XBMC goes, it surely shows a lot of potential, and I'm rather pleased with openELEC. Surprised and delighted. Except the setup, which is bollocks.

Nathan Willis from LWN.net wrote review of OpenELEC 5 in 2015:

OpenELEC has done a good job of making setup and configuration painless, which is certainly critical. But its primary competition these days is the array of cheap, streaming-only set-top boxes from Roku, Amazon, and the like, all of which deliver on ease-of-use and on ease-of-finding content. For an open-source project like Kodi to compete with the commercial products, it will probably have to simplify the process of finding and setting up add-ons. OpenELEC 5 brings Kodi closer than ever to being a plug-and-play product, but it is not quite foolproof yet.

One of DistroWatch Weekly editors, Jesse Smith, wrote in review of OpenELEC 5.0.8 in 2015:

Simply put, OpenELEC makes for a very good appliance-style operating system. It turns the host computer into an easy to use multimedia centre, the interface is easy to navigate and yet the distribution remains fairly flexible in both its appearance and function. If you're looking for an inexpensive media centre that is easier than the typical Linux distribution set up, then OpenELEC is definitely an option I would recommend trying.

== See also ==
- LibreELEC
- Comparison of video player software
- Comparison of PVR software packages
