= XAMPP =

Web server solution stack package

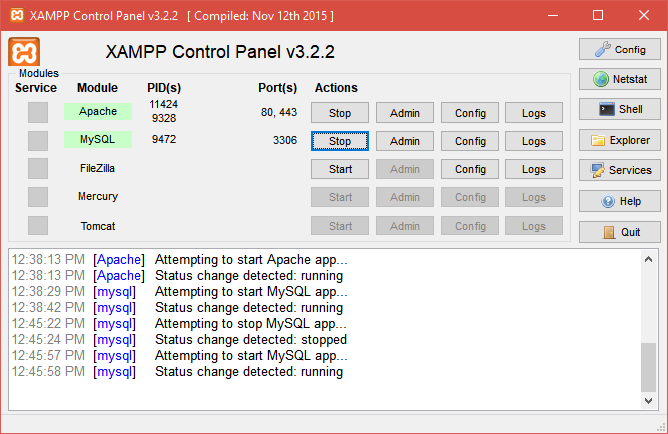
- Release: September 4, 2002; 24 years ago
- Stable release: 8.5.12 / 23 October 2026
- Operating system: Windows Server 2008 and later; Windows Vista and later; Mac OS X 10.6 and later; Linux
- Platform: x64 (Windows, macOS and Linux packages)
- Size: Windows: 148 MB; Linux: 150 MB; macOS: 149 MB
- Available in: 11 languages
- List of languages English, German, French, Dutch, Polish, Italian, Norwegian, Spanish, Chinese, Brazilian Portuguese, Japanese
- Type: Solution stack
- License: GNU General Public License
- Website: www.apachefriends.org
- Repository: sourceforge.net/projects/xampp

XAMPP (/ˈzæmp/ or /ˈɛks.æmp/) is a free and open-source cross-platform web server solution stack package developed by Apache Friends, consisting mainly of the Apache HTTP Server, MariaDB database, and interpreters for scripts written in the PHP and Perl programming languages. Since XAMPP bundles the core components of the LAMP stack, one of the most common ways to deliver web applications, it makes transitioning from a local test server to a live server easier.

XAMPP's ease of deployment means a WAMP or LAMP stack can be installed quickly and simply on an operating system by a developer, with the advantage that common add-in applications such as WordPress and Joomla! can also be installed with similar ease using Bitnami.

== Etymology ==
The Apache Friends website indicates that XAMPP stands for "XAMPP Apache + MariaDB + PHP + Perl", making it a recursive acronym. XAMPP formerly used MySQL, but this was replaced with MariaDB on 19 October 2015 and beginning with XAMPP versions 5.5.30 and 5.6.14, altering the meaning of the acronym. It originally stood for Cross-Platform + Apache + MySQL + PHP + Perl.

== Prerequisites ==
XAMPP requires only one zip, tar, 7z, or exe file to be downloaded and run, and little or no configuration of the various components that make up the web server is required. The Windows version of XAMPP requires Microsoft Visual C++ 2017 Redistributable.

== Features ==
Besides Apache, MariaDB, PHP and Perl, XAMPP comes with a number of other modules, including OpenSSL, phpMyAdmin, MediaWiki, Joomla, WordPress and more. Self-contained, multiple instances of XAMPP can exist on a single computer, and any given instance can be copied from one computer to another. XAMPP is offered in both a full and a standard version (Smaller version).

== Usage ==
The most obvious characteristic of XAMPP is the ease with which a WAMP webserver stack can be deployed and instantiated. Later, some common packaged applications that could be easily installed were provided by Bitnami.

Officially, XAMPP's designers intended it for use only as a development tool, to allow website designers and programmers to test their work on their own computers without any access to the Internet. To make this as easy as possible, many important security features are disabled by default. XAMPP has the ability to serve web pages on the World Wide Web. A special tool is provided to password-protect the most important parts of the package.

XAMPP also provides support for creating and manipulating databases in MariaDB and SQLite, among others.

Once XAMPP is installed, it is possible to treat a local host like a remote host by connecting using an FTP client. Using a program like FileZilla has many advantages when installing a content management system (CMS) like Joomla or WordPress. It is also possible to connect to localhost via FTP with an HTML editor.

== Components ==
Components included with XAMPP 8.2.12
Component	On Windows	On Linux	On macOS
Apache 2.4.58	Yes	Yes	Yes
MariaDB 10.4.32	Yes	Yes	Yes
PHP 8.2.12	Yes	Yes	Yes
phpMyAdmin 5.2.1	Yes	Yes	Yes
OpenSSL 3.1.3	Yes	Yes	Yes
Webalizer	Yes - 2.23-04	Yes - 2.23-05	Yes - 2.23-05
FileZilla FTP Server 0.9.41	Yes	No	No
Mercury Mail Transport System 4.63	Yes	No	No
Strawberry Perl 5.32.1.1 Portable	Yes	No	No
Tomcat 8.5.96 (with mod_proxy_ajp as connector)	Yes	No	No
XAMPP Control Panel 3.2.4	Yes	No	No
APR 1.5.2	No	Yes	Yes
APR-utils 1.5.4	No	Yes	Yes
cUrl 7.53.1	No	Yes	Yes
expat 2.0.1	No	Yes	Yes
FPDF 1.7	No	Yes	Yes
FreeTDS 0.91	No	Yes	Yes
Freetype2 2.4.8	No	Yes	Yes
GD 2.2.5	No	Yes	Yes
gdbm 1.8.3	No	Yes	Yes
gettext 0.19.8.1	No	Yes	Yes
ICU4C Library 66.1	No	Yes	Yes
IMAP C-Client 2007e	No	Yes	Yes
libapreq 2.13	No	Yes	Yes
libpng 1.6.37	No	Yes	Yes
libxml 2.0.1	No	Yes	Yes
libxslt 1.1.33	No	Yes	Yes
mcrypt 2.5.8	No	Yes	Yes
mhash 0.9.9.9	No	Yes	Yes
Ming 0.4.5	No	Yes	Yes
mod_perl 2.0.8-dev	No	Yes	Yes
ncurses 5.9	No	Yes	Yes
OpenLDAP (client) 2.4.48	No	Yes	Yes
pdf class 0.11.7	No	Yes	Yes
Perl 5.34.1	No	Yes	Yes
ProFTPD 1.3.6	No	Yes	Yes
Sablotron 1.0.3	No	Yes	Yes
zlib 1.2.11	No	Yes	Yes

Major component versions
XAMPP	Apache	MariaDB	PHP	Ref
8.0.0	2.4.46	10.4.17	8.0.0	
8.0.1	2.4.46	10.4.17	8.0.1	
8.0.2	2.4.46	10.4.17	8.0.2	
8.0.3	2.4.46	10.4.18	8.0.3	
8.0.5	2.4.47	10.4.18	8.0.5	
8.0.6	2.4.47	10.4.19	8.0.6	
8.0.7	2.4.48	10.4.19	8.0.7	
8.0.8	2.4.48	10.4.20	8.0.8	
8.0.9	2.4.48	10.4.20	8.0.9	
8.0.10	2.4.48	10.4.21	8.0.10	
8.0.11	2.4.51	10.4.21	8.0.11	
8.0.13	2.4.51	10.4.22	8.0.13	
8.0.14	2.4.52	10.4.22	8.0.14	
8.0.15	2.4.52	10.4.22	8.0.15	
8.0.17	2.4.52	10.4.24	8.0.17	
8.0.18	2.4.53	10.4.24	8.0.18	
8.0.19	2.4.53	10.4.24	8.0.19	
8.0.25	2.4.54	10.4.27	8.0.25	
8.0.28	2.4.56	10.4.28	8.0.28	
8.1.0	2.4.51	10.4.22	8.1.0	
8.1.1	2.4.52	10.4.22	8.1.1	
8.1.2	2.4.52	10.4.22	8.1.2	
8.1.4	2.4.52	10.4.24	8.1.4	
8.1.5	2.4.53	10.4.24	8.1.5	
8.1.6	2.4.53	10.4.24	8.1.6	
8.1.10	2.4.54	10.4.24	8.1.10	
8.1.12	2.4.54	10.4.27	8.1.12	
8.1.17	2.4.56	10.4.28	8.1.17	
8.2.0	2.4.54	10.4.27	8.2.0	
8.2.4	2.4.56	10.4.28	8.2.4	
8.2.12	2.4.58	10.4.32	8.2.12	

== See also ==
- Comparison of web server software
- LAMP (software bundle)
- lighttpd
