= RPath =

Former American software company

rPath, Inc. was a technology company based in Raleigh, North Carolina, that developed technology to automate the process of constructing (or packaging), deploying, and updating software. rPath modeled and managed components and dependencies under version control. It acted as a model-driven and version-controlled repository, as well as a software distribution hub.

In November 2012, rPath was acquired by SAS Institute. Shortly after the acquisition, rPath Linux was discontinued.

== History ==
rPath was founded in April 2005, and was originally known for packaging applications as virtual appliances for its independent software vendors (ISVs) and end-user customers. It was co-founded by Erik Troan, co-author of Red Hat Package Manager (RPM), a popular Linux package management system. Troan had left Red Hat in 2004 to create a company called Specifix. The first CEO was Bill Marshall. Original investors were North Bridge Venture Partners and General Catalyst Partners, with $6.4 million in funding disclosed in September 2005. A $9.1 million investment in February 2007 including a new investor Wakefield Group was disclosed. A $10 million investment was disclosed on June 24, 2008. A $7 million investment was disclosed during October, 2010. The company was headquartered in Raleigh, North Carolina.

rPath was one of the first companies to market a software appliance. In 2009, rPath made a transition to selling its products to enterprise IT organizations. IT automation was seen as the codification of runbooks by some, but rPath industrialized the operational aspects of the data center by modelling software configurations. rPath provided a commercial version control platform for deployed software systems. rPath was not a source code management system, but rather, an operational management system that applies the principles and disciplines of source code control to the management of deployable software systems—specifically, system manifests, packages, binaries, policies and system configurations. Version control aids systems to be quickly reproduced, patched and updated, rollback-ed and reported on.

rPath provided a system inventory. This inventory described the desired state of every file, binary, application component, and software stack on every production system—with complete information about applied policies and dependencies—as version-controlled system manifests. These manifests were actionable models for managing the complete lifecycle of deployed systems, providing the basis for understanding change impact and controlling change. Also, rather than applying universal updates, patches and updates could be targeted to only the systems that require change.

rPath allowed definition of systems as layered variants of common base platforms. For example, the standard corporate web server stack may start with a standard build of Red Hat Enterprise Linux (RHEL) but add a specific custom version of the Apache HTTP Server and remove all availability of FTP. With this feature, rPath enabled IT groups to define and automatically enforce build-time policies that govern how systems are constructed.

When rPath imported new or existing software artefacts into system version control, it automatically analyzed each software artifact to discover its entire software supply chain, including operating system (OS) components, middleware and libraries. This information enabled build-time system construction, validation and reduced the number of maintenance failures and outages that result from missing dependencies and conflicting components. "Ovum considers the automated dependency-checking capability to be an extremely useful and often overlooked feature that all such tools should employ." rPath ensured a consistent system definition, eliminating the risk of system "drift" between lifecycle stages and enabling a clean software build environment.

rPath developed Conary, an open-source software package management and configuration software that formed the core of rBuilder. It allowed rollbacks, incremental ("changeset") updates, and distributed downloading which removes the need for programs such as apt or yum.

rPath supported Microsoft Windows Server 2008 and 2003, Red Hat Enterprise Linux 4 and 5, SUSE Linux Enterprise Server 10, and CentOS. It was also marketed as software as a service.

The NRE Alliance was a coalition of newScale, rPath and Eucalyptus Systems to promote private and hybrid cloud computing. The coalition was announced on August 24, 2010. It had a live web site through August 2012.

On November 30, 2012, the business analytics company SAS Institute announced that it acquired key rPath assets, including technology and staff.
