= Just enough operating system =

Paradigm for customising operating systems

Just enough operating system (JeOS, pronounced "juice" according to SUSE) is a paradigm for customizing operating systems to fit the needs of a particular application such as for a software appliance. The platform only includes the operating system components required to support a particular application and any other third-party components contained in the appliance (e.g., the kernel). This makes the appliance smaller, faster (to boot and to execute the particular application) and potentially more secure than an application running under a full general-purpose OS.

== Common implementations ==
Typically, a JeOS will consist of the following:

- JeOS media (OS core [kernel, virtual drives, login])
- OS minimum maintenance tools
- Minimum user space tools
- Packages repository (DVD or network-based)

It is important to differentiate between true fully minimalized OS install profiles forced, for example, with security hardening tools or representing Recovery Console images and JeOS richer install profiles which are designed and built for wider audience usage, so VM/VA creators and their users can easily perform needed installation or configuration tasks.

== Differences between minimalist, lightweight and appliance ==
- Light-weight Linux distribution
- minimalist e.g. Porteus (operating system)

== See also ==
- BareMetal
- Container Linux (discontinued)
- Containerization (computing) (modern retake on JeOS)
- Embedded system
- LibreELEC (JeOS software appliance with Kodi Media Center)
- OpenELEC (discontinued JeOS software appliance with Kodi Media Center)
- PXE boot
- Thin client
- Ubuntu JeOS
