= Software appliance =

Type of software application

A software appliance is a software application combined with just enough operating system (JeOS) to run optimally on industry-standard hardware (typically a server) or in a virtual machine. It is a software distribution or firmware that implements a computer appliance.

Virtual appliances are a subset of software appliances. The main distinction is the packaging format and the specificity of the target platform. A virtual appliance is a virtual machine image designed to run on a specific virtualization platform, while a software appliance is often packaged in more generally applicable image format (e.g., Live CD) that supports installations to physical machines and multiple types of virtual machines.

Installing a software appliance to a virtual machine and packaging that into an image, creates a virtual appliance.

== Benefits ==
Software appliances have several benefits over traditional software applications that are installed on top of an operating system:

- Simplified deployment: A software appliance encapsulates an application's dependencies in a pre-integrated, self-contained unit. This can dramatically simplify software deployment by freeing users from having to worry about resolving potentially complex OS compatibility issues, library dependencies or undesirable interactions with other applications. This is known as a "toaster."
- Improved isolation: software appliances are typically used to run applications in isolation from one another. If the security of an appliance is compromised, or if the appliance crashes, other isolated appliances will not be affected.
- Improved performance: A software appliance does not embed any unused operating system services, applications or any form of bloatware hence it does not have to share the hardware resources (CPU, memory, storage space, ...) usually consumed by these on a generic OS setup. This naturally leads to faster boot time and application execution speed. In the case where multiple software appliances share and run simultaneously on the same hardware (on a virtualization platform for example) this will not hold true as running n instances of a software appliance (OS + software application) will consume more hardware resources than running n instances of a software application on 1 instance of an operating system due to the overhead of running n - 1 more instances of operating system.

== Types of software appliances ==
=== Virtual appliance ===
A software appliance can be packaged in a virtual machine format as a virtual appliance, allowing it to be run within a virtual machine container.

A virtual appliance could be built using either a standard virtual machine format such as Open Virtualization Format (OVF), or a format specific to a particular virtual machine container (for example, VMware, VirtualBox, or Amazon EC2).

=== Containers ===
Containers and their images (such as those provided by Docker and Docker Hub) can be seen as an implementation of software appliances.

=== Live CD appliance ===
A software appliance can be packaged as a Live CD image, allowing it to run on real hardware in addition to most types of virtual machines.

This allows developers to avoid the complexities involved in supporting multiple incompatible virtual machine image formats and focus on the lowest common denominator instead (i.e., ISO images are supported by most Virtual Machine platforms).

== Commercial software appliances ==
Commercial software appliances are typically sold as a subscription service (pay-as-you-go) and are an alternative approach to software as a service.

Customers can receive all service and maintenance from the application vendor, eliminating the requirement to manage multiple maintenance streams, licenses, and service contracts.

In some cases, the application vendor may install the software appliance on a piece of hardware prior to delivery to the customer, thereby creating a computer appliance. In both cases, the primary value to the customer remains the simplicity of purchase, deployment, and maintenance.

== See also ==
- Portable application
- Virtual appliance
- BitNami
- TurnKey Linux Virtual Appliance Library
- SUSE Studio - builds software appliances
- Windows To Go
