= USB image =

A USB image — is bootable image of Operating system (OS) or other software where the boot loader is located on a USB flash drive, or another USB device (with memory storage) instead of conventional CD or DVD discs. The operating system loads from the USB device either to load it much like a Live CD that runs OS or any other software from the storage or installs OS itself. USB image runs off of the USB device the whole time. A USB image is easier to carry, can be stored more safely than a conventional CD or DVD. Drawbacks are that some older devices may not support USB booting and that the USB storage devices lifespan might be shortened.

Ubuntu has included a utility for installing an operating system image file to a USB flash drive since version 9.10. Windows support also has added a step by step on how to set up a USB device as a bootable drive.

== Software ==
Both graphical applications and command line utilities are available for authoring bootable operating system images. dd is a utility commonly found in Unix operating systems that allow creation of bootable images.

== Benefits and limitations ==
=== Benefits ===
- In contrast to live CDs, a USB image is easier to transport and to store (e.g. a pocket, attached to a key chain, carried in a bag, locked away in a safe), instead of a CD, which can be damaged and corrupted easier, and also harder
- Also after OS installation, the USB can be removed after installation, and the operating system will run without the USB stick inserted into the computer, allowing installation on multiple OS devices with a single USB (This is known for Win 8.1 and newer Microsoft Win versions, since they fully support the USB image installation)
- The absence of moving parts in USB flash devices allows true random access avoiding the rotational latency and seek time, meaning small programs will start faster from a USB flash drive than from a local hard disk or live CD. However, as USB devices typically achieve lower data transfer rates than internal hard drives, booting from older computers that lack USB 2.0 or newer can be very slow.

=== Limitations ===
- Some older systems have limited support for USB, since their BIOSes were not designed with such purpose at the time. Other devices may not be booted from USB, if in BIOS it is set to 'Legacy mode'Legacy mode.
- Due to the additional write cycles that occur on a full installation, the life span of the used USB may be shortened. To mitigate this, a USB hard drive can be used, as they give better performance than the USB stick, regardless of the connector.

== See also ==
- UEFI
- ImageUSB (Per Partition or mounted Drive)
- Live USB
