= Open Virtualization Format =

Computer standard

- Filename extensions: ovf, ova
- Internet media type: application/ovf
- Initial release: V1.0.0 (September 2008; 17 years ago)
- Latest release: 2.1.1; August 2015; 10 years ago
- Contained by: ova
- Website: www.dmtf.org/standards/ovf

Open Virtualization Format (OVF) is an open standard for packaging and distributing virtual appliances or, more generally, software to be run in virtual machines.

The standard describes an "open, secure, portable, efficient and extensible format for the packaging and distribution of software to be run in virtual machines". The OVF standard is not tied to any particular hypervisor or instruction set architecture. The unit of packaging and distribution is a so-called OVF Package which may contain one or more virtual systems each of which can be deployed to a virtual machine.

== History ==
In September 2007 VMware, Dell, HP, IBM, Microsoft and XenSource submitted to the Distributed Management Task Force (DMTF) a proposal for OVF, then named "Open Virtual Machine Format".

The DMTF subsequently released the OVF Specification V1.0.0 as a preliminary standard in September, 2008, and V1.1.0 in January, 2010. In January 2013, DMTF released the second version of the standard, OVF 2.0 which applies to emerging cloud use cases and provides important developments from OVF 1.0 including improved network configuration support and package encryption capabilities for safe delivery.

ANSI has ratified OVF 1.1.0 as ANSI standard INCITS 469-2010.

OVF 1.1 was adopted in August 2011 by ISO/IEC JTC 1/SC 38 of the International Organization for Standardization (ISO) and the International Electrotechnical Commission (IEC) as an International Standard ISO/IEC 17203.

OVF 2.0 brings an enhanced set of capabilities to the packaging of virtual machines, making the standard applicable to a broader range of cloud use cases that are emerging as the industry enters the cloud era. The most significant improvements include support for network configuration along with the ability to encrypt the package to ensure safe delivery.

== Design ==
An OVF package consists of several files placed in one directory. An OVF package always contains exactly one OVF descriptor (a file with extension .ovf). The OVF descriptor is an XML file which describes the packaged virtual machine; it contains the metadata for the OVF package, such as name, hardware requirements, references to the other files in the OVF package and human-readable descriptions. In addition to the OVF descriptor, the OVF package will typically contain one or more disk images, and optionally certificate files and other auxiliary files.

The entire directory can be distributed as an Open Virtual Appliance (OVA) package, which is a tar archive file with the OVF directory inside.

== Industry support ==
OVF has generally been broadly accepted. Several virtualization players in the industry have announced support for OVF.

Virtualization platform	OVF support since	Release date
VirtualBox	2.2.0	April 2009
Red Hat Enterprise Virtualization	2.2	March 2010
VMware	ESX 3.5, Workstation 6.5, Player 3.1, Fusion 4.0	Dec 2007
XenServer	5.6 or XenConvert before that	May 2010
IBM Power server AIX, Linux z/VM, IBM Systems Director (via VMControl Enterprise Edition plug-in, a cross-platform VM manager)		
IBM SmartCloud	IBM SmartCloud Enterprise 1.4	Oct 2011
Oracle VM	3.0	Aug 2011
rPath	4.0	c.2008
SUSE Studio		Oct 2010
Microsoft System Center Virtual Machine Manager	2012	2012?
Amazon Elastic Compute Cloud		
Proxmox VE	5.0	Sep 2017
Google Cloud Platform		Jan 2020

== See also ==
- VHD (file format)
- VMDK
