= I-MSCP =

i-MSCP
- Developer: Agon Partners Innovation Team
- Stable release: 1.5.3-2018120800 (Ennio Morricone) / December 8, 2018; 7 years ago
- Written in: PHP, Perl
- Operating system: Linux
- Type: Utility software
- License: LGPL, MPL (Free Software)
- Website: agon-solution.ch
- Repository: github.com/i-MSCP/imscp

i-MSCP (internet Multi Server Control Panel) is a free and open-source software for shared hosting environments management on Linux servers. It comes with a large choice of modules for various services such as Apache2, ProFTPd, Dovecot, Courier, Bind9, and can be easily extended through plugins, or listener files using its events-based API.

Latest stable is the 1.5.3 version (build 2018120800) which has been released on 8 December 2018.

Development of i-MSCP was inactive for several years following that release, and the existing version subsequently became incompatible with newer Linux distributions and software dependencies.

In September 2026, development of i-MSCP was officially revived by its original author, Laurent Declercq. The project is now owned and fully supported by AGON PARTNERS INNOVATION AG, where Declercq serves as Chief Technology Officer and continues to lead its development.

The revival initially focuses on restoring compatibility with current Debian and Ubuntu releases, followed by a progressive modernization of the platform. The first release of the revived i-MSCP project is planned for the middle of October 2026.

== Licensing ==
i-MSCP has a dual license. A part of the base code is licensed under the Mozilla Public License. All new code, and submissions to i-MSCP are licensed under the GNU Lesser General Public License Version 2.1 (LGPLv2). To solve this license conflict there is work on a complete rewrite for a completely LGPLv2 licensed i-MSCP.

== Features ==
=== Supported Linux Distributions ===
- Debian Jessie (8.x), Stretch (9.x), Buster (10.x)
- Devuan Jessie (1.0), ASCII (2.x)
- Ubuntu Trusty Thar (14.04 LTS), Bionic Beaver (18.04 LTS)

=== Supported Daemons / Services ===
- Web server: Apache (ITK, Fcgid and FastCGI/PHP-FPM), Nginx
- Name server: Bind9
- MTA (Mail Transport Agent): Postfix
- MDA (Mail Delivery Agent): Courier, Dovecot
- Database: MySQL, MariaDB, Percona
- FTP-Server: ProFTPD, vsftpd
- Web statistics: AWStats

=== Addons ===
- PhpMyAdmin
- Net2ftp
- Roundcube

== Competing software ==
- cPanel
- DTC
- Froxlor
- ISPConfig
- ispCP
- OpenPanel
- hestiacp
- Plesk
- SysCP
- Virtualmin
