= Comparison of web hosting control panels =

The following sections compare general and technical information for a variety of web hosting control panel software packages.

== License and operating system support ==
=== Free and open source control panels ===
Systems listed on a light purple background are no longer in active development.

Control panel	License	Alive (last release)	BSD	Linux	Windows	Frontend	Backend	Plugin Support	VCS	IPv6 Support	Multiserver Support
AlternC	GPL 2	2017-11-07	No	Yes	No	PHP	PHP / Perl / Shell script	Yes	git	Yes	No
Domain Technologie Control	GNU LGPL	2013/04/04	Limited FreeBSD support	Yes	No	PHP	MySQL	?	git	No	?
Froxlor	GPL	2024-03-29	No	Yes	No	PHP	PHP, MariaDB or MySQL	No	git	Yes	No
i-MSCP	GPL, MPL	2018-05-16	No	Yes	No	PHP	Perl, C	Yes	git	Yes	No
ISPConfig	BSD	2025-04-25; 1882 years ago; 18 months ago	No	Yes	No	PHP	PHP, MariaDB or MySQL	Yes	git	Yes	Yes
Kloxo	AGPL	2011/11/13	No	CentOS (6 not currently supported) or Red Hat EL 5.x	No	PHP	PHP, MySQL	No	git	No	Yes
Usermin	BSD style	2024-04-15	Yes	Yes	No	Perl	Perl	?	tarball	?	?
Virtualmin	GPL	2024-03-24	Yes	Yes	No	Perl	Perl	Yes	tarball	Yes	Partial
Webmin	BSD style	2026-09-21; 2 months ago	Yes	Yes	Partial	Perl	Perl	Yes	git	Yes	Yes
Zentyal	GPL	2024-02-26; 1883 years ago; 2 years ago	No	Yes	No	Perl	Perl	Yes	git	?	?

=== Proprietary control panels ===
Systems listed on a light purple background are no longer in active development.

Control panel	Alive (last release)	BSD	Linux	Windows	Frontend	Backend	Plugin Support	HTTP/2 Support	IPV6 Support	Multiserver Support
cPanel & WHM	2024-04-19	FreeBSD version retired	Yes	EOL	Perl	Perl, MariaDB, MySQL	Yes	Yes	Yes	Yes
DirectAdmin	2024-06-01	FreeBSD version retired	Yes	No	C++, scripts, PHP, Vue.js	C++, scripts, PHP	Yes	Yes	Yes	Yes
Plesk	2024-04-16	No	Yes	Yes	PHP	PHP, MariaDB, MySQL, PostgreSQL	Yes	Yes	Yes	Yes
Virtualmin Pro	2024-03-24	Yes	Yes	No	Perl	Perl	Yes	No	Yes	Partial

== Remote access ==
Some control panels allow shell (console) access to the underlying OS through a Java applet, requiring that the client-side computer use Java Virtual Machine software. Other control panels allow direct access using telnet or secure shell (SSH).

Control panel	FTP	Anonymous FTP	Terminal	File browse/upload/download HTTP frontend
cPanel & WHM	Yes	Yes	SSH, Java Applet	Yes
DirectAdmin	Yes	Yes	SSH	Yes
Domain Technologie Control	Yes	?	SSH	Yes
i-MSCP	Yes	No	SSH	Yes
ISPConfig	Yes	Yes	SSH	No
Kloxo	Yes	Yes	SSH, Java Applet	Yes
Plesk	Yes	Yes	SSH, Java Applet	Yes
Usermin	Yes	Yes	SSH, Java Applet	Yes
Virtualmin	Yes	Yes	SSH, Java Applet	Yes
Virtualmin Pro	Yes	Yes	SSH, Java Applet	Yes
Webmin	Yes	Yes	SSH, Java Applet	Yes

== Email management ==
While all control panel software below supports multiple email accounts, the features they provide vary.

Control panel	Antivirus	Antispam	Forwarders	Mailbox quota	DomainKeys	DKIM
cPanel & WHM	Yes	Yes	Yes	Yes	Yes	Yes
DirectAdmin	Yes	Yes	Yes	Yes	Yes	Yes
Domain Technologie Control	Yes	Yes	Yes	Yes	Yes	Yes
i-MSCP	Optional	Optional	Yes	Optional	Optional	Optional
ISPConfig	Yes	Yes	Yes	Yes	Yes	Yes
Kloxo	Yes	Yes	Yes	Yes	Yes	Yes
Plesk	Yes	Yes	Yes	Yes	Yes	Yes
Usermin	Yes	Yes	Yes	Yes	No	No
Virtualmin	Yes	Yes	Yes	Yes	Yes	Yes
Virtualmin Pro	Yes	Yes	Yes	Yes	Yes	Yes
Webmin	Yes	Yes	Yes	Yes	Yes	Yes
