= DirectAdmin =

Web hosting control panel

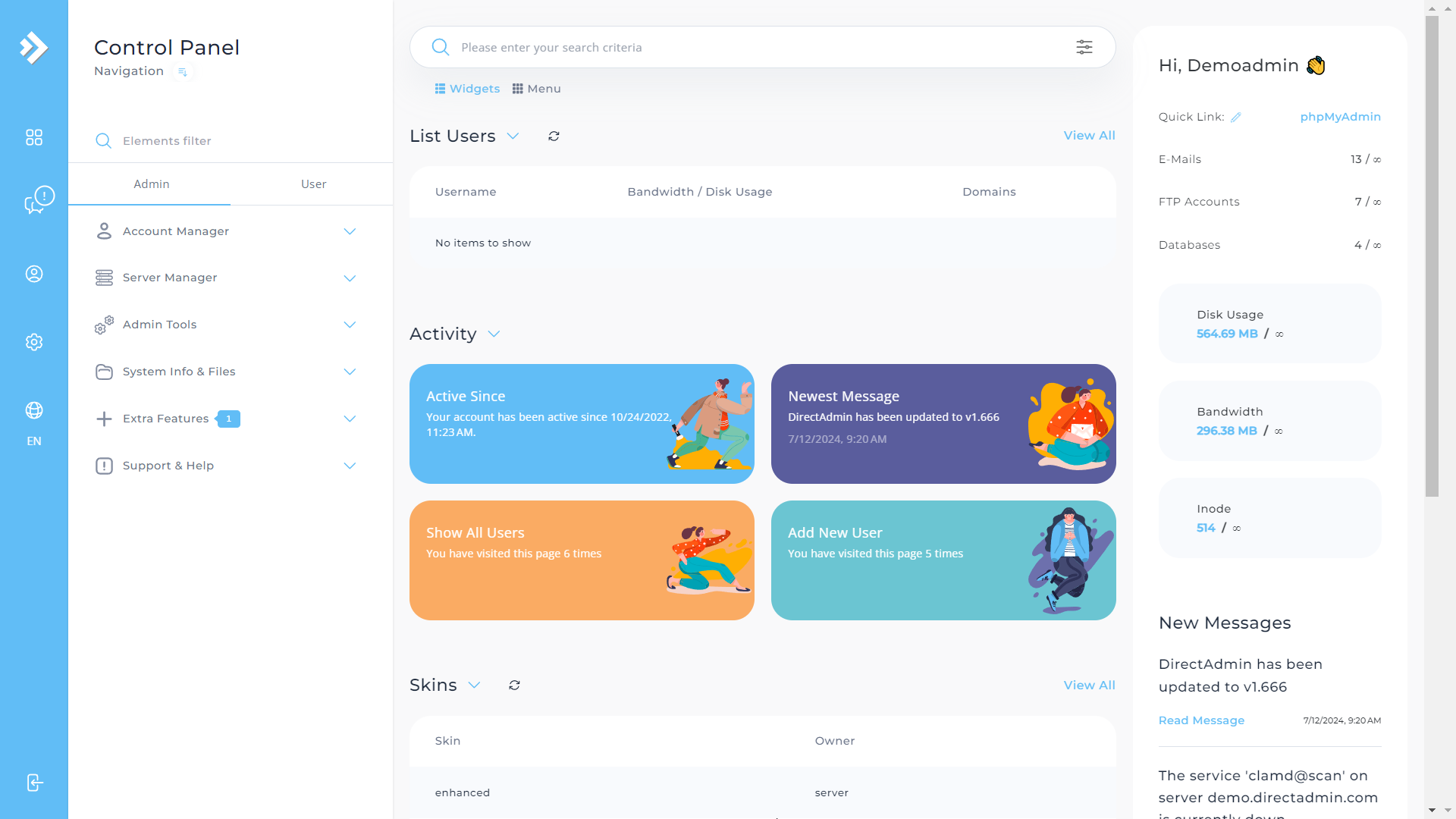
- Main page of DirectAdmin Web Control Panel
- Original author: JBMC Software
- Developer: JBMC Software
- Release: 01.03.2003
- Operating system: Linux
- Available in: English, others (user submitted)
- Type: Web hosting control panel
- License: Proprietary
- Website: www.directadmin.com

DirectAdmin is a graphical web-based web hosting control panel allowing administration of websites through a web browser. The software is configurable to enable standalone, reseller, and shared web hosting from a single instance. DirectAdmin also permits management of server tasks and upgrades to package software (such as Apache HTTP Server, PHP, and MySQL) from within the control panel, simplifying server and hosting configuration.

== System requirements ==
DirectAdmin is compatible with several versions of CloudLinux, Red Hat, Fedora Core, Red Hat Enterprise Linux, CentOS, Ubuntu and Debian.

- Processor: 500 MHz
- Memory: 1 GB (2 GB is preferred), with at least 2 GB of swap memory
- HDD Space: minimal 2 GB free space (after the Linux install)

== See also ==
- cPanel
- Domain Technologie Control
- ISPConfig
- Kloxo
- Webmin
- AlternC
