= LimeSurvey =

Free open source survey tool

- Original author: LimeSurvey GmbH
- Developers: Carsten Schmitz & LimeSurvey Team
- Release: February 20, 2003; 23 years ago
- Stable release: 6.6.6 (build 241002) (October 2, 2024; 21 months ago) [±]
- Written in: PHP
- Available in: 82 languages & dialects
- License: GNU General Public License
- Website: limesurvey.org
- Repository: github.com/LimeSurvey/LimeSurvey

LimeSurvey (formerly PHPSurveyor) is a free and open source online statistical survey web app written in PHP using a MySQL, SQLite, PostgreSQL or MSSQL database, distributed under the GNU General Public License. Its web interface enables users to develop and publish online surveys, collect responses, review statistics, and export the resulting data to other applications.

== History ==
LimeSurvey was registered as a SourceForge.net project called PHPSurveyor on February 20, 2003 and was originally written by the Australian software developer Jason Cleeland. The first public release, version 0.93, was published on March 5, 2003. The project quickly developed a large audience of users after the development of advanced features such as branching (conditions), token control and templating.

In 2004, during the 2004 U.S. presidential election, PHPSurveyor was used to gather data about voting irregularities. It identified over 13500 incidents in the first 10 hours of voting and was selected as part of their Election Incident Reporting System.

On May 17, 2007 the project name was changed from PHPSurveyor to LimeSurvey in order to make software licensing easier by not including PHP in the name.

In late 2008, a LimeSurvey hosting service named LimeService was created by LimeSurvey project leader Carsten Schmitz. It hosts LimeSurvey for users for a small fee per response.

As of June 4, 2008, LimeSurvey was ranked on SourceForge.net with an overall rank of 99 out of over 100,000 projects as of June 4, 2008.

In 2009, LimeSurvey participated in the Google Summer of Code, a program encouraging students older than 18 years old to work on projects aimed at helping open-source projects. The student projects helped develop the interface and statistical modules of the upcoming LimeSurvey 2.0.

In 2010, LimeSurvey again participated in Google Summer of Code. Students developed a Database Storage Engine for LimeSurvey 2.0, and implemented the "File upload question" type. In November, LimeSurvey also participated in the Google Code-in, a similar program rewarding high school students to contribute to open source projects. Tasks ranged from improving LimeSurvey's Wikipedia pages to enhancing the user interface. LimeSurvey also participated in the 2011 Google Summer of Code.

As of 2010, LimeSurvey had 2,944 weekly downloads on SourceForge, and an Alexa traffic rank of 32,633.

=== Version 2.0 ===
In 2012 the LimeSurvey development team released LimeSurvey 2.0. The code base for LimeSurvey 2.0 was completely re-written from scratch using a MVC (model–view–controller) approach and the Yii PHP framework. Besides the structural code changes aimed at better modularity the new version also has a new GUI with a completely new design using AJAX technology.

=== Foundation of LimeSurvey GmbH ===
In August 2015 the LimeSurvey GmbH was founded, a limited liability corporation, with the goal to better coordinate further development and provide services around LimeSurvey.

=== Version 2.50 ===
In 2016 Version 2.50 was released by LimeSurvey GmbH which has a completely revamped administration user interface and fully responsive survey design templates.

=== Version 3.0 ===
In December 2017 version 3.0 was released. Beside changes in the administration interface for better usability the outdated design template system was converted to use the Twig template engine for templates.

== Basic features ==
LimeSurvey is a web application that is installed to the user's server. After installation users can manage LimeSurvey from a web-interface. Users can use rich text in questions and messages, using a rich text editor, and images and videos can be integrated into the survey. The layout and design of the survey can be modified under a template system. Templates can be changed in a WYSIWYG HTML editor. Additionally, templates can be imported and exported through the template editor. Once a survey is finalized, the user can activate it, making it available for respondents to view and answer. Likewise, questions can also be imported and exported through the editor interface. LimeSurvey has no limit on the number of surveys a user can create, nor is there a limit on how many participants can respond. Aside from technical and practical constraints, there is also no limit on the number of questions each survey may have.

Questions are added in groups. The questions within each group are organized on the same page. Surveys can include a variety of question types that take many response formats, including multiple choice, text input, drop-down lists, numerical input, slider input, and simple yes/no input. Questions can be arranged in a two-dimensional array, with options along one axis based on the questions on the other axis. Questions can depend on the results of other questions. For instance, respondents might only be asked about transportation for their commute if they responded affirmatively to a question about having a job.

LimeSurvey also provides basic statistical and graphical analysis of survey results. Surveys can either be publicly accessible or be strictly controlled through the use of "once-only" tokens, granted only to selected participants. Additionally, participants can be anonymous, or LimeSurvey can track the IP addresses of the participants. A much more detailed listing of features can be found on the LimeSurvey web page.

== Hosting ==
Some web hosting services offer LimeSurvey hosting, either as a custom installation or through a control panel, such as cPanel with Fantastico, Plesk, Softaculous, or Virtualmin Professional. LimeSurvey has also been ported by third parties to various content management systems, such as PostNuke, and XOOPS. A port to Joomla exists, but it is not compatible with version 1.5 of Joomla.

The governing organization LimeSurvey GmbH, co-founded by the long-term project leader Carsten Schmitz, also offers the LimeSurvey Cloud hosting service. This service is similar to web applications such as SurveyMonkey; the main difference being that LimeSurvey Cloud fees are based only on the number of people that respond to the survey within a certain time frame and not on limitation of features, like other similar services. The LimeSurvey Cloud hosting offers up to 25 free responses per month, after which responses can be purchased in one of several subscriptions.

== International features ==
LimeSurvey in general uses the UTF-8 character set to be able to display all languages. As of October 2024, both the frontend and backend of LimeSurvey are available in 116 languages and dialects; 27 of these have at least 95% of the translations done (Catalan, Chinese, Czech, Dutch, Finnish, French, Galician, German, Greek, Hungarian, Italian, Japanese, Korean, Norwegian, Polish, Portuguese, Russian, Slovak, Spanish, Swedish, Thai, Turkish).

== Applications ==
LimeSurvey allows users to create and host surveys, for general data gathering purposes. It can be used for collecting data from customers and employees.

LimeSurvey is used by the Austrian Vorarlberg State Government, Ars Electronica, and several open source organizations such as OpenOffice.org, Ubuntu, and GNOME. LimeSurvey is also used by educational institutions in 19 countries.

== Reception ==
In December 2007, LimeSurvey won the first place Les Trophées du Libre award in the category Enterprise Management. The Les Trophées du libre contest recognizes innovative and promising Open Source projects. In 2008 LimeSurvey was nominated in the category Best Project for the Enterprise in the SourceForge.net Community Choice Awards 2008.

== See also ==
- Comparison of survey software
- Open-source model
- Sampling (statistics)
