= AlternC =

- Developer: Misc Contributors
- Release: November 2000; 26 years ago
- Stable release: 3.5.4 / January 14, 2026
- Written in: PHP
- Operating system: UNIX-like
- Type: Web hosting Server
- License: GPLv2
- Website: www.alternc.com
- Repository: github.com/AlternC/AlternC

AlternC is a set of open-source Web hosting server management software for Linux/UNIX-like systems, whose aim is to promote self-hosting by individuals or small structures, and provide its users with an easy web-based interface to manage a web and mail server (and other Internet-based services).

Its purpose is to provide users with a non-technical web interface to host web services. It has some advanced options for experienced users to customize configurations.

It also features documentation in French and English.

== History ==
In 2000, the French free hosting provider Altern.org stopped its service after a complaint and a trial against Estelle Hallyday, effectively cutting down 47634 websites. Later, Valentin Lacambre released his hosting control panel as free software, hoping that people will take it and be more independent of big hosting structures as his, in favor of free speech and alternative hosting.

In May 2001, Valentin's source code was abandoned, and a rewrite started by the technical team at l’Autre Net (a non-profit hosting provider organized in as self-managed association), which gave birth to AlternC, which wanted to follow the same guidelines as Valentin's panel (mostly on usability and design).

As of today, some non-profit hosting providers are using and developing that software suite: Lautre Net, the founder of that project, but also Globenet, and other structures in Belgium, Québec and Africa.

Some professional web hosting companies are also using AlternC and participate actively to the code, such as Octopuce, Neuronnexion and Webelys.

This project is still actively developed.

== Version numbering ==
After a long series of 0.9.preXX and 0.9.x versions, version 1.0 was published in June 2011, with a new web interface design, more current and usable. A paperback book, in French, was also published at that time, effectively making 2011 a milestone in this software history.

The next version, released in February 2013, was version 3.0, mainly because some plugins were on different version numbers, and the development team wanted to make them coherent with the main software version (the Mailman plugin was version 2.1 already). Many new features and bugfixes where present in that version. The most notable one was the migration from Courier to Dovecot for the email service, and the separation, for security reasons, of all web hosting services using distincts Unix user accounts, thanks to the ITK module of the Apache HTTP Server.

The latest versions of AlternC are:

- 3.1.10 (for Squeeze) / 3.2.10 (for Wheezy) / 3.3.10 (for Jessie) released on January 18, 2016,
- 3.1.9 (for Squeeze) / 3.2.9 (for Wheezy) released on November 17, 2015,
- 3.1.8 (for Squeeze) / 3.2.8 (for Wheezy) released on August 3, 2015

== Features ==
- Domain name management
- DNS management
- Subdomain creation
- User account management
- Website and Web application hosting
- Email hosting
- Mailing list hosting
- Online file manager
- Security of the files and configuration
- Website statistics

AlternC is based on Debian Linux, and is using the standard Debian packages, therefore it can be used with the same level of security as Debian, and its standard configuration tools. This allows a system administrator to manage a server with AlternC and other services in the same machine.

== See also ==
=== Bibliography ===
- Bernard-Putz, Chantal; Sonntag, Benjamin (2011). AlternC Comme si vous y étiez. In Libro Veritas. ISBN 978-2-35922-035-3. Archived from the original on 2013-01-28.

=== Other articles ===
- cPanel
- DirectAdmin
- Domain Technologie Control
- ISPConfig
- Kloxo
- Plesk
- Webmin
