= Control panel (software) =

User interface software

Many computer user interfaces use a control panel metaphor to give the user control of software and hardware features. The control panel consists of multiple settings including display settings, network settings, user account settings, and hardware settings. Control panels are also used by web applications for easy graphical configuration. Some services offered by control panels require the user to have admin rights or root access.

== Computer history ==
The term control panel was used for the plugboards in unit record equipment and in the early computers of the 1940s and '50s. In the 1980s, the Xerox Star and the Apple Lisa, which pioneered the first graphical user interface metaphors, controlled user settings by single click selections and variable fields. In 1984 the Apple Macintosh in its initial release made use of fundamental graphic representation of a "control panel board" imitating the operation of slider controls, on/off buttons and radio-select buttons that corresponded to user settings.

== Functionality ==
There are many tasks grouped in a control panel:

=== Hardware ===
- Color
  - Color management
- Computer displays
  - Brightness
  - Contrast
  - Color calibration
  - Energy saving
  - Gamma correction
  - Screen resolution and orientation
- Graphics tablet
- Keyboard
  - Shortcuts and bindings
  - Language and layout
  - Text cursor appearance
- Mouse and touchpad
- Power management
  - Energy saving
  - Battery usage
  - Display brightness
  - Power button actions
  - Power plans
- Printers and scanners
- Sound

=== Networking ===
- Bluetooth connection and file exchange
- Ethernet connection
- Internet Accounts
  - E-mail integration
  - Social media integration
- Wi-Fi connection
- System-wide proxy

=== Security ===
- Certificates and password management
- Firewall
- Filesystem encryption
- Privacy
  - File indexing and event tracking
  - Data sharing

=== System ===
- Login window
- System information
  - Hostname
- System time
  - Calendar system
  - NTP server
  - Time zone
- Software management
  - Application management
  - System update configuration
  - Software sources

== Different types ==
- In Microsoft Windows operating systems, the Control Panel and Settings app are where various computer settings can be modified.
- In the classic Mac OS, a control panel served a similar purpose. In macOS, the equivalent to control panels are referred to as System Preferences.
- In web hosting, browser-based control panels, such as CPanel and Plesk, are used to manage servers, web services and users.
- There are different control panels in free desktops, like GNOME, KDE, Webmin...

== See also ==
- Control panel (engineering)
- Dashboard (business)
