= PHP2Shell =

2026 software security vulnerability

CVE-2026-109618
- CVSS 4.0 score: 9.2
- CVSS 4.0 vector: CVSS:4.0/AV:N/AC:H/AT:P/PR:N/UI:N/VC:H/VI:H/VA:H/SC:N/SI:N/SA:N
- CVSS 3.x score: 9.8
- CVSS 3.x vector: CVSS:3.1/AV:N/AC:L/PR:N/UI:N/S:U/C:H/I:H/A:H

CVE-2026-109619
- CVSS 4.0 score: 9.2
- CVSS 4.0 vector: CVSS:4.0/AV:N/AC:H/AT:P/PR:N/UI:N/VC:H/VI:H/VA:H/SC:N/SI:N/SA:N
- CVSS 3.x score: 8.1
- CVSS 3.x vector: CVSS:3.1/AV:N/AC:H/PR:N/UI:N/S:U/C:H/I:H/A:H
- Date discovered: 1 August 2026; 3 months ago
- Date patched: 21 October 2026; 16 days ago
- Discoverer: Calif, OpenAI, Wiz
- Affected software: PHP versions 5.4–8.5
- Website: php2shell.com

Wikimedia's Phabricator instance as seen hours before the patch, disabled as a precaution

PHP2Shell is a pair of high-impact computer vulnerabilities (CVE-2026-109618 and CVE-2026-109619) concerning memory safety flaws in PHP versions 5.4–8.5 that allow remote code execution (RCE). PHP is a popular programming language on which many website and web application codebases are built; these vulnerabilities were estimated to affect nearly 70% of websites at the time of their disclosure. The vulnerabilities were discovered with the help of AI in August 2026 and their existence was publicly announced on 20 October 2026. An emergency patch for versions 8.2, 8.3, 8.4 and 8.5 and details about the vulnerabilities were released the following day, with numerous websites temporarily taken offline to apply the patches before exploits (software that uses a security hole to compromise a computer) could be used.

== Discovery ==
The vulnerabilities were independently discovered by two parties: by Ryan Austin, a researcher at the California-based security firm Calif, as part of the OpenAI "Patch the Planet" project in August 2026; and by the Israeli-American cloud security company Wiz, a subsidiary of Alphabet Inc. and a part of Google Cloud. Austin used OpenAI's GPT-5.6 Sol model to assist with finding the vulnerability. Wiz researchers used the large language models Gemini 4 Argon and GPT-5.6 Sol, as well as their own tool, Wiz Atlas, to help with their research. Wiz coined the name "PHP2Shell" indicating that PHP exploits would enable execution of shellcode on affected servers.

PHP versions as early as 5.4 (released in 2012) were affected by these vulnerabilities, and while concerns around memory safety bugs had been raised decades before, no action was taken at the time because it was not thought that developing a working exploit could be feasible. A PHP core developer discovered the out-of-memory error behind one of the vulnerabilities during an audit in 2024, but the bug was never fixed; the development team could not reach consensus on how to do so, and a specific exploit had not yet been discovered, so the issue was not prioritized.

The vulnerability was rated 9.2 (critical) out of 10 under CVSS v4.0 by PHP developers, while security firm watchTowr rated it a full 10.0.

== Patches ==
The maintainers of PHP released patched versions of PHP 8.2, 8.3, 8.4, and 8.5 (8.2.35, 8.3.36, 8.4.27, and 8.5.12). Source code patches were released for versions 7.4, 8.0, and 8.1, but no official updated binaries for those versions were released as they are considered end of life. Temporary mitigations were also published, but the maintainers said there were no complete mitigations and that updating was the only safe choice. Both vulnerabilities were published through GitHub security advisories on 21 October 2026 at 13:34 UTC, 26 minutes before the announced release time, with the PHP website updated shortly thereafter. cPanel and CloudLinux released backports in their ecosystems. Volunteer maintainer Ondřej Surý, who was given advance access to the fixes by the PHP project, prepared installable packages for old versions from the patched source code so that server administrators could automate deployments without compiling PHP themselves. In response to claims on X (formerly Twitter) that unpatched older PHP releases left one-third of the Internet permanently vulnerable, Surý stated that there were ways to patch and update the older versions as well.

The PHP maintainers announced the update early and before release, after news of the vulnerabilities leaked on 20 October on the internet. The leaks occurred in an anonymous post on the Hacker News forums, in a post on X by cybersecurity company watchTowr labs, and in a proof-of-concept exploit video mistakenly released by Calif. The early notice on PHP.net encouraged users to prepare and update as soon as the patch was released. One security firm, Sansec, expected "mass attacks to start within 15 minutes of the release". Proof-of-concept exploits, write-ups, and partial mitigations started circulating on the internet before the end of the embargo, after development platform Chainguard released patched versions of the software early; this allowed attackers to determine what code had been changed.

== Impact ==
The potential impacts of the vulnerability were widespread. According to web survey provider W3Techs, among websites whose server-side programming language is known, approximately 69% use PHP. This includes websites that use content management systems such as Drupal, Joomla, and WordPress. PHP is also bundled with vendor appliances, web host control panels such as cPanel and Plesk, and some Windows applications.

Following advice from CERT-EU and the British National Cyber Security Centre (NCSC), many organizations across Europe took their websites offline as a precaution while the patches were pending, including the Dutch government portal Overheid.nl, the Danish national school communication platform, all Finnish government public-facing web services, and all websites of the French Interior Ministry. Some Canadian government websites were temporarily taken down as a precaution as taken following guidance from the Canadian Centre for Cyber Security. The US National Security Agency recommended that websites go offline if unable to update immediately. The NCSC released a similar warning, urging organizations to be wary of backdoors. The Japanese National Cybersecurity Office advised PHP users to immediately update their systems. The Singaporean Cyber Security Agency has also urged organizations in Singapore to fix the security flaws.

The Wikimedia Foundation shut down many of their supporting services, and forum sites such as 4chan and Something Awful went offline. Several Japanese websites and applications also went offline, including games such as Umamusume: Pretty Derby, Granblue Fantasy, Princess Connect! Re:Dive, Street Fighter V, and numerous e-commerce sites. The Internet Archive briefly shut down to fix the issue.

== Analysis ==
Researchers at Wiz stated that the issue was on par with Heartbleed, a 2014 vulnerability that affected OpenSSL, an encryption library used by about two-thirds of the web at the time. Coverage in The New York Times said that PHP was "pervasive" and speculated that "everyday users" could have their personal data put at risk.

Commentary in The Guardian noted that The PHP Foundation, which maintains the PHP language, only had 13 full- and part-time employees, and relied on financial contributions, whereas AI research, which was credited with helping discover the vulnerability, received "billions" in investment.

== Exploitation ==
Amazon Threat Intelligence identified a PHP2Shell exploitation attempt dating back to 17 October in MadPot telemetry, four days before public disclosure. Cloudflare reported signs of early exploitation prior to public patch release and deployed temporary web application firewall rules as an attempted stopgap mitigation against the vulnerability. Security firm watchTowr said it had observed exploitation in the wild by 21 October through its honeypot network, while the US Cybersecurity and Infrastructure Security Agency said it had not observed exploitation as of the same day.

On 25 October, security researcher Jaydip Modhwadia exploited PHP2Shell to achieve remote code execution on a server running an unpatched version of PHP during an online security challenge called "Steal My Bitcoin", demonstrating that the vulnerability was exploitable in practice.

== See also ==
- Artificial intelligence controversies
- Black October (information security) – October 2026 in information security
- Log4Shell – 2021 software security vulnerability
