= Virtualmin =

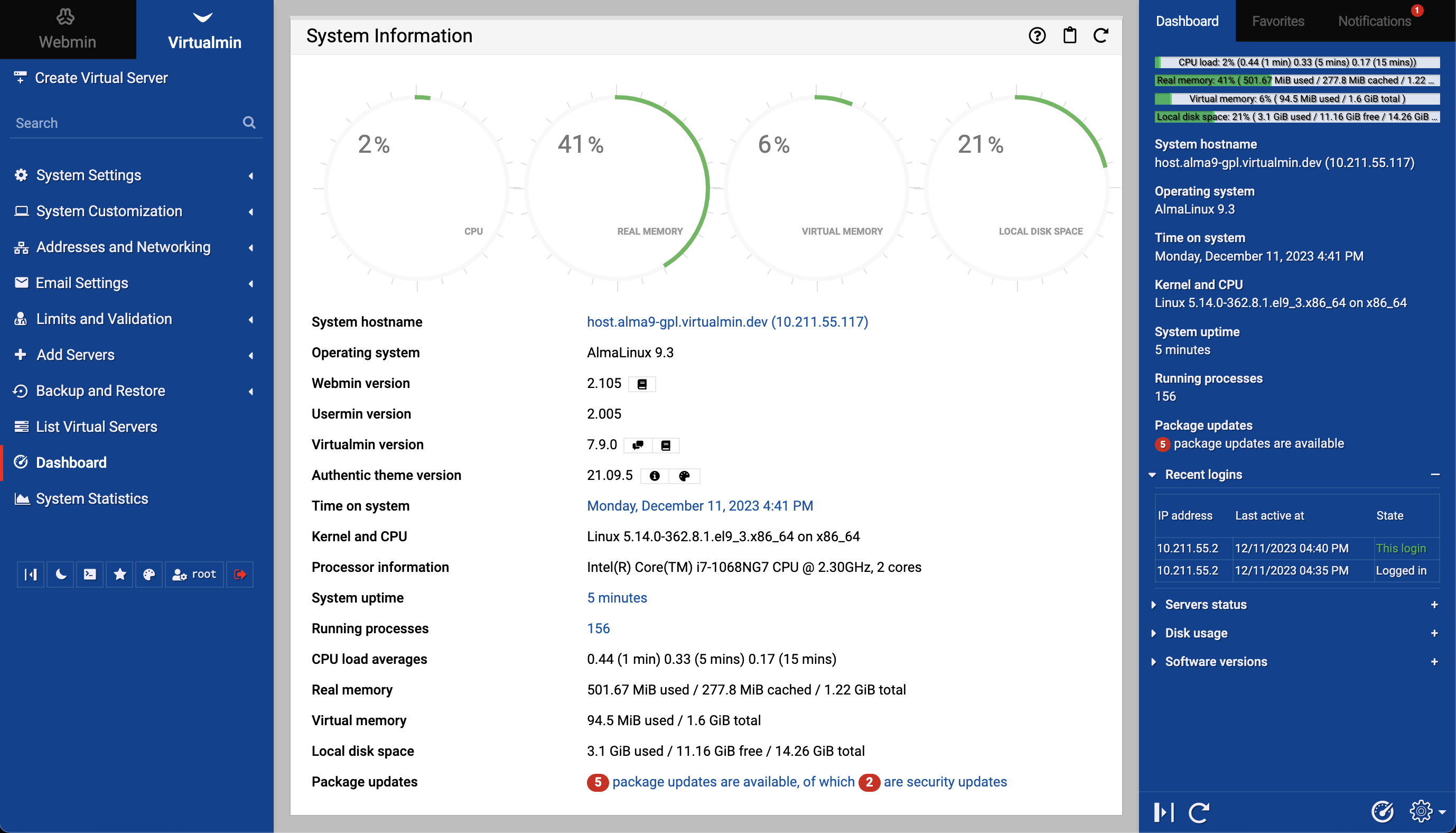
- Virtualmin in light mode
- Developers: Jamie Cameron, Joe Cooper, Ilia Rostovtsev a.k.a. Ilia Ross
- Release: 25 October 2003 v1.1
- Stable release: 7.40.1 / September 19, 2025; 13 months ago
- Written in: Perl
- Operating system: Linux (Debian, Ubuntu, AlmaLinux, Rocky Linux, RHEL)
- Type: Web hosting control panel
- License: GNU General Public License
- Website: www.virtualmin.com

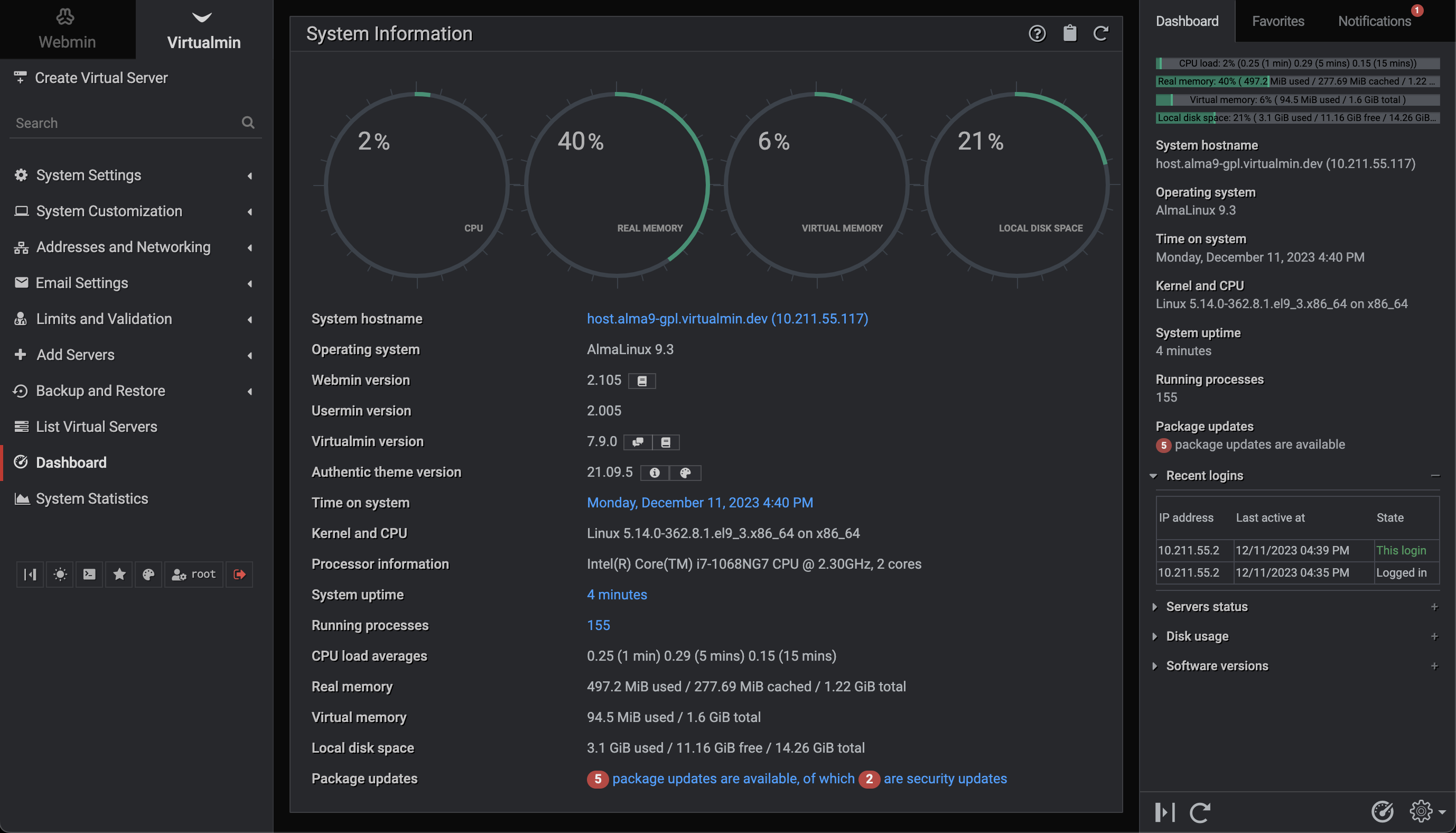
Virtualmin in dark mode

Virtualmin is a domain hosting and website control panel which gives the ability to create and manage many domains, as well as simplify both automation and tasks. It is based on Webmin. Virtualmin is an alternative to cPanel and Plesk.

== General description ==
Virtualmin is available in two versions. Virtualmin GPL and Virtualmin Professional. The Virtualmin GPL version is a fully free and open-source software and does not require a monthly fee, compared to the Virtualmin Professional version which requires a monthly or annual fee.

Both Virtualmin versions are able to create virtual servers with fully independent users, mailboxes, web application development environments, websites, web applications, quotas, account rules, and instances of web server, database server, and create other needed software. Supported web servers include, but are not limited to, Apache or httpd.

== See also ==
- Domain Technologie Control
- Webmin
