= Softaculous =

Softaculous is a commercial script library that automates the installation of commercial and open source web applications to a website. Softaculous scripts are executed from the administration area of a website control panel, typically via an interface tool such as cPanel, Plesk, or DirectAdmin. Softaculous applications, such as WordPress, Joomla, Drupal, or Magento, typically create tables in a database, install software, adjust permissions, and modify web server configuration files.

Softaculous targets open-source software and is available in free and premium license versions. The free version supports 46 scripts, and the premium version supports 436 scripts and 1,115 PHP classes.
