= Control panel =

Control panel may refer to:

- Control panel (engineering), a flat, often vertical, area where control instrumentation is mounted
- Control panel (software), the tool in the operating system which allows most or all of the settings to be changed through a user interface
  - Control Panel (Windows)
  - System Preferences, a computer program in the macOS operating system
  - Web hosting control panel
- Plugboard, also called a control panel

== See also ==
- Telephone switchboard, a manual exchange
- Patch panel
- Dashboard
