= Les Trophées du Libre =

Free software development contest

The Les Trophées du Libre contest was a free software contest whose goal was to promote innovative software projects by giving those projects recognition and media coverage and rewarding participating students and academic institutions with special prizes.

== Details ==
The international competition was intended both to free development professionals and amateurs. Participating projects could apply to seven categories: Security, Games, Multimedia, Business Management, Education, Science applications and administration and communities.

The first edition (2003) had 113 applying projects from 18 different countries.

The president for the 2009 edition was Pierre Spilleboudt. The jury was composed of about 30 experts. The Trophées du Libre's fifth award ceremony took place in June 2009.

== Results ==
=== 1st edition – 2003 ===
- Gcompris in the category of "Educational"
- Koha in the category "Public Organizations"
- GOK in the category of "Accessibility"
- Dolibarr in the category "Management Company"
- Weasel Reader in the category of "Public"
- Vega Strike in the category "Games"

=== 2nd edition – 2005 ===
- Lodel in the category "Public Organizations and Communities"
- Prométhée (logiciel) in the category of "Education"
- MedinTux in the category "Business Management"
- VideoLAN in the category of "Multimedia"
- NuFW in the category "Security"
- MediaWiki as "Special Prize PHP"

=== 3rd edition – 2006 ===
- Public Organizations and Communities
1. OpenElec, complete management tools of the electoral rolls
2. demexp, system waiter of vote on computer
3. OpenJUMP, geographical information system
- Education
1. Stellarium, a planetarium computerized for the exploration of stars, constellations, and other heavenly bodies
2. ICONITO, gate dedicated to the educational/school actors integrating tools and resources
3. Prométhée (logiciel), "ready to use" open source Virtual Learning Environment for schools 100% free
- Business Management:
1. Open Mobile ISOpen Mobile IS, framework for the development of mobile applications of companies
2. SpagoBI, integrated platform of decisional data processing
3. Pentaho, platform of decisional and management of flows in company
- Multimedia
1. Ekiga (GnomeMeeting), software of telephony on Internet
2. GCstar, personal manager of collections multimedia
3. Azureus, P2P-client for the distribution of big binary files
- Security
1. OCS Inventory Next Generation, tool for monitoring the configuration of the software on networks
2. GLPI, management tool of helpdesk under licence GPL
3. M0n0wall, firewall multipurpose
- PHP
1. AlternC, software of management of mutualized lodging
2. phpMyVisites, measure of audience and statistics for the Web sites
3. phpMyAdmin, Web manager for the database MySQL, translated into 50 languages

=== 4th edition – 2007 ===
| Category | Gold | Silver | Bronze |
|---|---|---|---|
| Security | Rsyncrypto (ISR) | Unicornscan (SWE) | Yersinia (ESP) |
| Business Management | LimeSurvey (GER) | Scenari (FRA) | DeStar (COL) |
| Administration and Communities | DRBL (TPE) | PMB (FRA) | VHFFS (FRA) |
| Educational Software | Chronojump (ESP) | Scenari (FRA) | Claroline (BEL) |
| Multimedia / Games | Mediabox404 (FRA) | sK1 (UKR) | Herrie (NED) |
| Scientific Software | SAGE (USA) | GetFEM++ (FRA) | Giac/Xcas (FRA) |

Special prize of the jury: Bioclipse.

=== 5th edition – 2009 ===
| Category | Gold | Silver | Bronze |
|---|---|---|---|
| Multimedia | UniConvertor (UKR) | Coherence (FRA) | Kinovea (FRA) |
| Professional | GOsa (BEL) | Support Incident Tracker (GBR) | Projectivity 3.0 (ITA) |
| Security | Ksplice (USA) | Enigform and mod_openpgp (ARG) | Inquisitor (RUS) |
| Administration | Linea21 (FRA) | Tellmatic (GER) | —N/a |
| Sciences | MathGL (RUS) | Gmsh (BEL) | GRAPHITE (FRA) |
| Hobbies | PyChess (DEN) | Neverball (CAN) | Djl (FRA) |
| Education | Vallect (FRA) | OSCAR (FRA) | Emustru (IND) |

Special awards:

- Open source spirit award: Ksplice
- Special jury award: Coherence
- Innovative project award: GRAPHITE

The 5th edition (2009) was the last one of this contest and online web portal of contest is not available anymore.

== See also ==
- List of computer-related awards
