= Control card =

The term control card can refer to:

- A document or device used in orienteering that is marked by some means at each control point to show that the competitor has completed the course correctly
- A document carried in the long-distance cycling sport randonneuring
- In computing, a specific type of punched card used for job control instructions
- A circuit board containing electronics for motion control

== See also ==
- Control panel (disambiguation)
