= MedinTux =

- Original author: Dr Roland Sevin
- Stable release: 2.16 / 19 June 2016; 9 years ago
- Operating system: Linux, macOS, Microsoft Windows
- Available in: French
- Type: healthcare management
- License: CeCILL
- Website: www.medintux.org

MedinTux is a free healthcare software for managing consultations, written for the French environment.

== Features ==
Originally written for the French emergency services, its modular conception allow it to be used in almost any area of medical or paramedical specialization.

The software works in a networked and multi-users environment. The following features are currently available:

- consultations
- meetings
- prescriptions
- monitoring of static or dynamic variables
- ICD-10, CCAM, CCMU and GEMSA codings
- statistics
- Vidal Data Semp
- retrieval of analysis via FTP
- real time visualisation of biometric curves
- management of multimedia documents (images...)
- OCR
- accounting
- easy input with hierarchy menus, which can be parametrised

== Software architecture ==
The program is written in C++, using the Qt3 library and Mysql database for storage. A web enabled MedWebTux also exist, which allow access from a browser. It's been ported to various OS:

- Linux (tested on Mandriva, Ubuntu, SuSE, Xandros eeePC)
- Microsoft Windows
- macOS

== Awards ==
- Winner of the 2005 Trophées du libre, in the enterprise management category.
- Nominated at the 2007 Lutèce d'Or
