= ISPConfig =

Hosting control panel for Linux

- Developer: ISPConfig UG
- Stable release: 3.3.0 / 25 April 2025; 11 months ago
- Written in: PHP
- Operating system: Linux
- Available in: 22 languages
- Type: Web hosting control panel
- License: BSD license
- Website: ispconfig.org

ISPConfig is an open source hosting control panel for Linux, licensed under BSD license and developed by the company ISPConfig UG. The ISPConfig project was started in autumn 2005 by Till Brehm from the German company projektfarm GmbH.

== Overview ==
Using the dashboard, administrators have the ability to manage websites, email addresses, MySQL and MariaDB as well as PostgreSQL (since version 3.3) databases, FTP accounts, Shell accounts and DNS records through a web-based interface. The software has 4 login levels: administrator, reseller, client, and email-user, each with a different set of permissions.

== Operating Systems ==
ISPConfig is only available on Linux, with CentOS, Debian, and Ubuntu being among the supported distributions.

== Features ==
The following services and features are supported:

- Management of a single or multiple servers from one control panel.
- Web server management for Apache HTTP Server and Nginx.
- Mail server management (with virtual mail users) with spam and antivirus filter using Postfix (software) and Dovecot (software).
- DNS server management (BIND, Powerdns).
- Configuration mirroring and clusters.
- Administrator, reseller, client and mail-user login.
- Virtual server management for OpenVZ Servers.
- Website statistics using Webalizer and AWStats

== See also ==
- Web hosting control panel
- Comparison of web hosting control panels
