= LiteLLM =

Open-source large language model service

- Developer: BerriAI
- Release: 2023
- Written in: Python and TypeScript
- Type: LLM gateway
- License: MIT License
- Website: www.litellm.ai
- Repository: https://github.com/BerriAI/litellm

LiteLLM is an open-source large language model (LLM) gateway used in AI-assisted software development. It is currently developed by BerriAI, founded by Ishaan Jaffer and Krrish Dholakia. It provides a unified application programming interface (API) for accessing and routing requests to different AI model providers. LiteLLM can be deployed as a self-hosted proxy server or used as a Python library and SDK within applications.

== Functionality ==
LiteLLM provides a common interface for models and services from providers including OpenAI, Anthropic, Google Gemini, Amazon Bedrock, Microsoft Azure, and Hugging Face. It translates requests and responses between provider APIs into a consistent OpenAI's completion()-based format, allowing applications to switch between models without separately implementing each provider's interface. LiteLLM also supports the Model Context Protocol (MCP), an open protocol developed by Anthropic for connecting AI applications to external tools and data sources.

The software also provides typical management features for online services, such as model routing, load balancing, fallbacks, authentication, rate limiting, usage monitoring, and cost controls. Its proxy server can act as a centralized API gateway through which multiple applications or users access AI models.

== Security ==
In March 2026, malicious versions of LiteLLM were distributed through the Python Package Index (PyPI) as part of a software supply-chain attack. TechCrunch reported that AI recruiting company Mercor was among the organizations affected by the compromise.

In October 2026, another supply chain attack affected the release infrastructure of LiteLLM, allowing actors to publish malicious versions to PyPI and distribute compromised container images through Docker registries. After their discovery, the compromised versions were subsequently withdrawn.

== See also ==
- List of AI-assisted software development tools
- OpenRouter – proprietary LLM gateway
- Black October (information security)
