= Analog (program) =

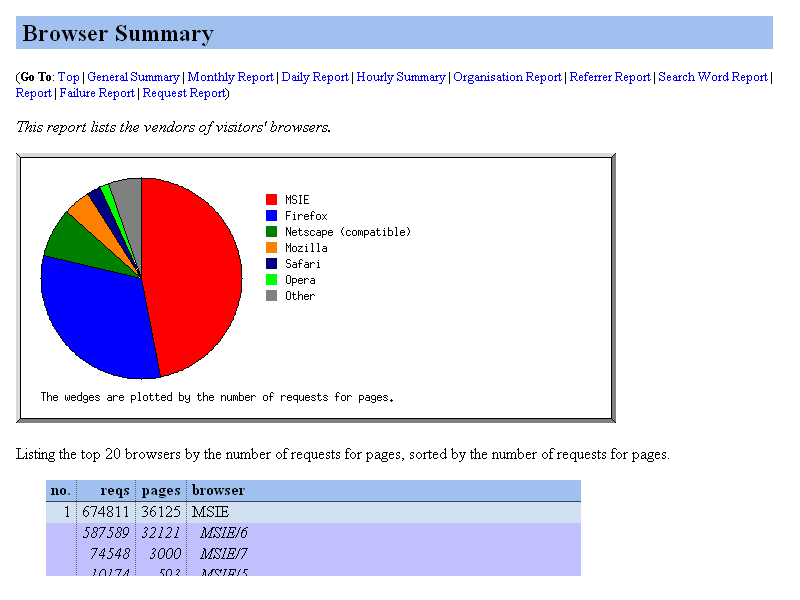
- Original author: Stephen Turner
- Developers: Stephen Turner, Chris Tilley
- Initial release: June 21, 1995; 30 years ago
- Stable release: 6.0.18 / August 14, 2024; 19 months ago
- Written in: C
- Operating system: Mac/Windows/Unix/Linux
- Platform: Various
- Available in: Many
- License: GPL
- Website: analog.gsp.com

Analog is a free web log analysis computer program that runs under Windows, macOS, Linux, and most Unix-like operating systems. It was first released on June 21, 1995, by Stephen Turner as generic freeware; the license was changed to the GNU General Public License in November 2004. The software can be downloaded for several computing platforms, or the source code can be downloaded and compiled if desired.

Analog has support for 35 languages, and provides the ability to do reverse DNS lookups on log files, to indicate where web site hits originate. It can analyze several different types of web server logs, including Apache, IIS, and iPlanet. It has over 200 configuration options and can generate 32 reports. It also supports log files for multiple virtual hosts.

The program is comparable to Webalizer or AWStats, though it does not use as many images, preferring to stick with simple bar charts and lists to communicate similar information. Analog can export reports in a number of formats including HTML, XHTML, XML, Latex and a delimited output mode (for example CSV) for importing into other programs. Delimited or "computer" output from Analog is often used to generate more structured and graphically rich reports using the third party Report Magic program.

The popularity of Analog is largely unknown as no download count information has been released on its historic dissemination. In a 1998 survey by the Graphic, Visualization, & Usability Center (GVU), Analog was reportedly used by 24.9% (up from 19.9% the year before), with its nearest rival, Web Trends holding some 20.3% of the market.

It is not clear how Analog's usage has changed in the decade leading up to 2010, nor how its usage profile has been impacted by on-line analysis services such as Google Analytics. Analog can operate on an individual or web-farm basis from a single process, requiring no modification of web page or web script code in order to use it. It is a stand-alone utility, and it is not possible for visiting clients to block all of the logging of traffic directly from the client.

Analog has not been officially updated since the version 6.0 release in December 2004. The original author moved on to commercial traffic analysis. Updates to Analog continued informally by its user community up until the end of 2009 on the official mailing list. Currently the only formally compiled updated redistributable of Analog is that of Analog CE, which has focused on fixing issues in Analog's XML DTD and on adding new operating system and web browser detection to the original code branch.
