= Black October (information security) =

October 2026 in information security

In information security, October 2026 has been referred to as Black October due to several major security incidents and vulnerability disclosures. The events drew attention to the growing use of artificial intelligence in vulnerability research and the potential consequences for widely deployed software and internet infrastructure.

The events included the disclosure of the PHP2Shell vulnerabilities, a software supply chain attack affecting LiteLLM, and the compromise of intermediate certificate authority keys operated by eMudhra. A separate security release for Node.js addressed several vulnerabilities, including a potentially exploitable flaw in its Brotli decompression implementation. Additionally, a severe vulnerability in GitLab was fixed and made public.

== Major incidents ==
=== eMudhra weak key incident ===
On 17 October 2026, a security researcher reported that the private keys associated with eight intermediate certificate authority (CA) certificates operated by the Indian digital trust provider eMudhra were cryptographically weak. The keys had been generated with insufficient randomness during a key-generation ceremony in April 2025, making it possible to recover them and create fraudulent certificates trusted by vulnerable clients.

The discovery prompted emergency responses from major browser vendors. Google Chrome blocked the affected public keys through its CRLSet mechanism, while Mozilla distributed revocations to Firefox users through OneCRL. These protections were deployed without requiring an immediate browser restart.

eMudhra stated that none of the affected intermediate authorities had issued end-entity certificates and that it had found no evidence of a breach of its infrastructure or customer data.

On 22 October, eMudhra announced that it would withdraw from the global SSL/TLS certificate business following the incident and the resulting loss of trust from major technology companies.

=== Oracle unauthenticated SQL injection flaw ===
On October 20, 2026, Oracle released a security patch for a security flaw in E-Business Suite. The issue CVE-2026-101767, an unauthenticated SQL injection vulnerability, could allow remote code execution and access to sensitive financial, payroll, and HR data.

=== PHP2Shell vulnerabilities ===
On 21 October 2026, the PHP development team released emergency security updates addressing two critical vulnerabilities, CVE-2026-109618 and CVE-2026-109619, collectively known as PHP2Shell. The vulnerabilities affected the core PHP interpreter and could allow unauthenticated attackers to execute arbitrary code on vulnerable web servers.

Researchers from Wiz reported that the vulnerabilities involved memory-management errors in PHP, including the reuse of freed memory and the persistence of invalid internal state between requests. The researchers demonstrated remote code execution against installations of WordPress, Drupal, and Joomla, as well as the disclosure of sensitive process memory.

The widespread deployment of PHP raised concerns about the potential exposure of websites and web applications.

The PHP project released patched versions 8.2.35, 8.3.36, 8.4.27 and 8.5.12 on 21 October. The United States National Security Agency also issued an advisory recommending urgent patching of affected systems.

=== LiteLLM supply-chain attack ===
On 21 October 2026, the release infrastructure of LiteLLM, an open-source gateway for accessing multiple large language model providers, was compromised in a software supply chain attack. Attackers published a malicious version, 1.107.0, to the Python Package Index (PyPI) and distributed compromised container images through Docker registries.

The malicious release contained credential-stealing software and remote-access functionality. Researchers reported that the malware targeted browser credentials, cloud service secrets, developer authentication tokens and API keys used by AI services.

According to LiteLLM's incident report, the compromised PyPI packages were available between 11:39 and 13:23 UTC on 21 October. Affected Docker Hub images were distributed between approximately 11:46 and 14:20 UTC. The compromised packages were subsequently withdrawn or replaced.

A subsequent investigation found that the attackers had obtained developer credentials and manipulated the project's release workflow to publish malicious artifacts. LiteLLM advised affected users to rebuild compromised environments and rotate potentially exposed credentials.

=== GitLab remote code execution ===
On October 21, GitLab Inc. released fixes for a flaw that, under certain conditions, allows an attacker to carry out remote code execution on self-managed instances of GitLab. GitLab Inc. has not specified what those conditions are. The flaw got the designation CVE-2026-110264.

=== Brotli out-of-bounds write ===
On 21 October 2026, security patches were released to address an out-of-bounds write vulnerability in Google's open-source Brotli data compression library. The vulnerability, tracked as CVE-2026-111497, affected multiple versions of the Brotli decoder and could allow an unauthenticated remote attacker to corrupt adjacent decoder state memory by supplying a specially crafted compressed data stream. Potential consequences include information disclosure, denial of service, and arbitrary code execution. The vulnerability also affected software incorporating the Brotli decoder, including Node.js, Firefox, and Thunderbird.

=== EDK II PXE pre-boot code execution vulnerability ===
On 22 October 2026, the TianoCore project publicly disclosed CVE-2026-97631, a critical vulnerability in the EDK II firmware implementation's network boot driver. The flaw could allow an attacker to execute arbitrary code during the pre-boot phase of a system using affected firmware and network boot functionality.

The vulnerability is a buffer overflow in the PXE Base Code driver, which handles network booting over IPv4 and IPv6. Incorrect bounds handling when copying Internet Control Message Protocol (ICMP) error messages into a fixed-size buffer can cause an out-of-bounds memory write. Under suitable conditions, an unauthenticated attacker able to deliver a crafted message while a vulnerable system is network-booting could cause a denial of service or execute code before the operating system loads.

The issue was assigned a CVSS 4.0 base score of 9.5 out of 10, classified as critical. Researchers Alex Matrosov of Anthropic and Dan Holmes-Mitra of Google were credited with discovering the vulnerability.

The vulnerability affects systems that use the vulnerable EDK II network boot implementation; it does not affect devices that boot exclusively from local storage. Remediation requires firmware updates incorporating a fix for the affected driver. At the time of the public advisory, the upstream project had not listed a patched version.

=== Linux kernel vulnerabilities ===
A remote code execution vulnerability was discovered in the Linux kernel's network stack and made public. It has been assigned CVE-2026-98432 and CVSS 9.8.

Trend Micro reported 6 vulnerabilities, including two remote code execution vulnerabilities. These were disclosed on the public Linux kernel mailing list without patch.

== Other incidents ==
Several other cybersecurity incidents occurred during October 2026 that were not directly associated with the term "Black October".

- 2026 Binance hack
- 2026 French supermarket refrigerator hack
- Archive of Our Own 2026 security breach incident

== Subsequent incidents ==
Related cybersecurity incidents continued to occur into November of 2026 that were associated with the related phrase Eternal October, initially coined in 2016.

- November attacks on European refrigeration and freezer systems
- SSHhole
- ARTEX
- Java4Shell (CVE-2026-114938)

== See also ==
- Cyber Security Awareness Month
- List of security hacking incidents
- November 2026 technology outages
