= Web counter =

Web page hit count indicator

A web counter or hit counter is a publicly displayed running tally of the number of visits a webpage has received.

Web counters are usually displayed as an inline digital image or in plain text. Image rendering of digits may use a variety of fonts and styles, with a classic design imitating the wheels of an odometer. Web counters were often accompanied by the date it was set up or last reset, to provide more context to readers on how to interpret the number shown. Although initially a way to publicly showcase a site's popularity to its visitors, some early web counters were simply web bugs used by webmasters to track hits and included no visible on-page elements.

Counters were popular in the 1990s but were later replaced by other web traffic measures such as self-hosted scripts like Analog, and later on by remote systems that used JavaScript, like Google Analytics. These systems typically do not include on-page elements displaying the count. Thus, seeing a web counter on a modern web page is one example of retrocomputing on the Internet.

Owing to their ubiquity, hit counters were also a useful tool to collect data on the global usage share of web browsers for a time.

== Counter SEO schemes ==
In one search engine optimization spamming technique, companies paid to have their site listed in the HTML code of a free hit counter. When a webmaster put it on their page, a small link appeared at the bottom, providing a way for sites to artificially accumulate inbound links. This was often done by sites in very competitive industries like online gambling. In 2008, Google removed a number of high-ranking mesothelioma sites that had been using counters from the top results.
