= ProFTPD =

Open-source FTP server software

- Developers: John Morrissey, Michael Renner, Daniel Roesen, TJ Saunders, et al.
- Stable release: 1.3.8c / 11 December 2024; 16 months ago
- Preview release: 1.3.9rc3 / 11 December 2024; 16 months ago
- Operating system: Unix-like systems
- Type: FTP daemon
- License: GPL-2.0-or-later
- Website: www.proftpd.org
- Repository: github.com/proftpd/proftpd

ProFTPD (short for Pro FTP daemon) is an FTP server. ProFTPD is Free and open-source software, compatible with Unix-like systems and Microsoft Windows (via Cygwin). Along with vsftpd and Pure-FTPd, ProFTPD is among the most popular FTP servers in Unix-like environments today. Compared to those, which focus e.g. on simplicity, speed or security, ProFTPD's primary design goal is to be a highly feature rich FTP server, exposing a large amount of configuration options to the user.

== Supported platforms ==
- AIX
- BSD/OS
- DG/UX
- Digital Unix
- FreeBSD
- HP/UX
- IRIX
- Linux
- Mac OS X
- NetBSD
- OpenBSD
- SCO
- Solaris
- SunOS
- Windows (via Cygwin)

== Configuration and features ==
ProFTPD includes a number of options that are not available with many other FTP daemons. The configuration of ProFTPD is performed in a single main configuration file called /etc/proftpd/proftpd.conf. Due to its similarities to the configuration file of Apache HTTP Server it is intuitively understandable to someone who uses this popular web server.

Some of the most noticeable features are:

- Per directory ".ftpaccess" configuration similar to Apache's ".htaccess"
- Multiple virtual FTP servers and anonymous FTP services
- Runs either as a stand-alone server or from inetd/xinetd, depending on system load
- Anonymous FTP root directories do not require any specific directory structure, system binaries or other system files
- No SITE EXEC command, which in modern Internet environments represent a security issue
- Hidden directories and files, based on Unix-style permissions or user/group ownership
- Runs as a configurable non-privileged user in stand-alone mode in order to decrease chances of attacks which might exploit its "root" abilities
- Logging and utmp/wtmp support.
- Shadow password suite support, including support for expired accounts
- Modular design, allowing server to be extended easily with modules. Modules have been written for SQL databases, LDAP servers, SSL/TLS encryption, RADIUS support, etc.
- IPv6 support

== Graphical user interface ==
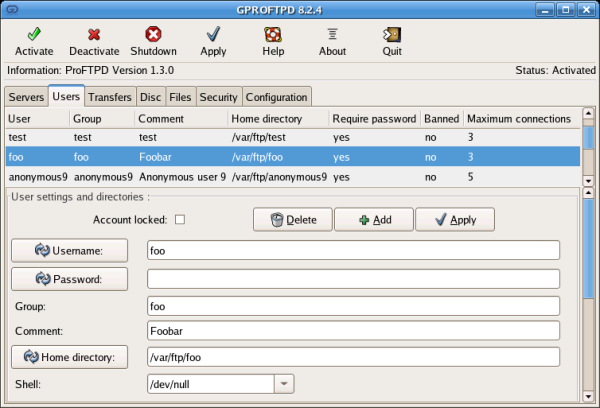
Screenshot of GAdmin-ProFTPD showing the user administration tab.

ProFTPD comes with a command-line interface (CLI) only, but there are several third-party Graphical user interfaces (GUI) existing for ProFTP for users who prefer this to the CLI, or like to use a combination of both. Especially when it comes for example to real-time monitoring of current user actions and file transmissions, a GUI can be very helpful and superior to the CLI. Some existing GUIs for ProFTPD are (selection):

- GAdmin-ProFTPD, a GTK+ front end for GNOME and KDE, as a part of the GAdmintools collection
- ProFTPD Admin
- ProFTPD PHP/MySQL administration tool
- ProFTPD Administrator

== See also ==
- FTP server
