= Froxlor =

- Stable release: 2.3.14 / September 15, 2026; 8 days ago
- Written in: PHP
- Operating system: Linux / Unix
- Type: Web hosting control panel
- License: GPL-2.0 license
- Website: www.froxlor.org
- Repository: https://github.com/Froxlor/Froxlor

Froxlor is a free and open-source web hosting control panel which originated from the SysCP project. It is released under the terms of the GNU General Public License v2.0.

== History ==
On February 1, 2010, the Froxlor 0.9 was released, and it was a fork of the SysCP project. It introduced multiple bug fixes and was seen as an intermediate step between SysCP and the Froxlor 1.0 release.

In 2015, it was revealed that versions prior to 0.9.33.1 contained a database security vulnerability which was fixed in the next version. This vulnerability allowed attackers to remotely read database passwords from the publicly accessed folder /logs/sql-error.log. MySQL errors, which were logged in this folder, contained database logins and passwords, although the passwords were visible only up to 15 characters.

On April 10, 2019, version 0.10.0 was released. The main change was the introduction of the API backend.

On January 8, 2023, version 2.0 was released. The UI was redesigned to be more customizable. The installation process was made easier and allowed the SSL activation directly within the installation process. Also, this update introduced the command line tool.

On December 8, 2023, version 2.1 was released. New features include the ability to duplicate domains (use settings from the existing domain for the new domain), deactivate single domains and ftp-accounts, and generate one-time login-links for customers via CLI or API.

== Features ==
Froxlor has the following features:

- Configuration of which ports to use and whether to use IPv4 or IPv6 per domain
- Configuration of SSL certificates per domain
- PHP configuration (different php.ini files for different domains)
- API support
- MySQL management
- FTP and e-mail support

== See also ==
- net2ftp
