= Usermin =

Web-based user interface for Unix-like systems

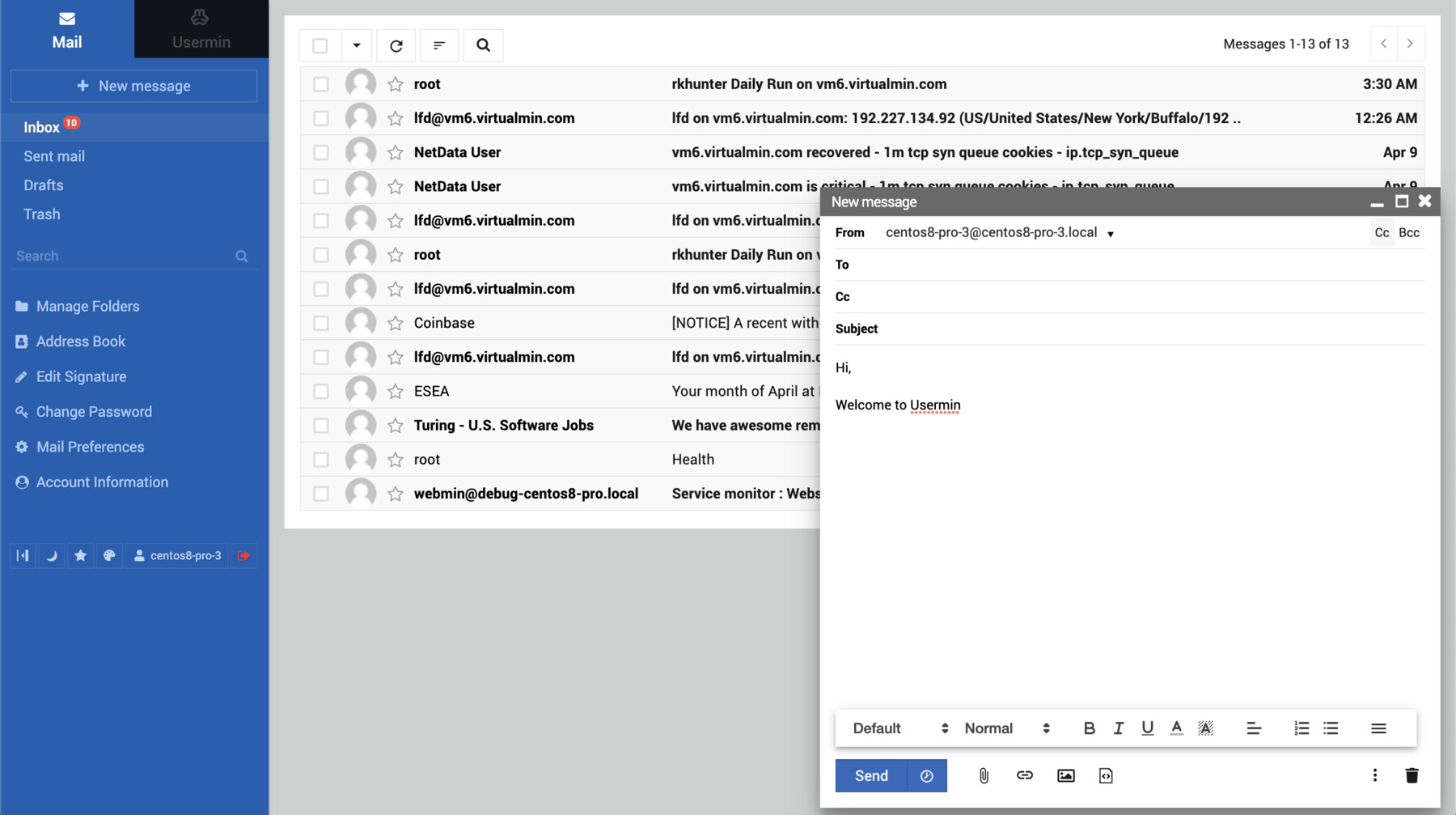
- Usermin mail UI overview with Authentic Theme
- Original author(s): Jamie Cameron
- Developer(s): Jamie Cameron, Ilia Rostovtsev
- Initial release: March 6, 2002 (version 0.4)
- Stable release: 2.010 / April 15, 2024; 16 months ago
- Written in: Perl
- Operating system: Most Linux distros such as: Redhat, Fedora, CentOS, SuSE, Mandrake Linux, Debian and Ubuntu
- License: BSD-like licence
- Website: www.webmin.com/usermin.html

Usermin is a free and open-source webmail interface for non-root users. With it designed for deployment by system administrators on a Unix-like system the sysadmin will set limits for their customer's so that they can only access the tasks that they would be able to perform if they were logged in via SSH or at the console.

Usermin is distributed under the BSD licence and can be deployed for use using the Usermin Configuration Module within Webmin by the administrator. Since Usermin has an extensive collection of modules the administrator has control over exactly what the end user can see and access. Usermin also provides web interfaces for the viewing and managing of the data in MySQL and PostgreSQL databases, plus editing of the Apache .htaccess configuration files, and also allows for the running of commands on the server by the administrator and any users given the permissions to do so.

Usermin is written in Perl 5 using the Authen::PAM Perl module and deployed on port 20000 by default. Any changes by the system administrator of Usermin from its default settings will result in the changes being written in the system configuration files directly.

== Features ==
Usermin has the following features:

- Reading email
- Changing passwords
- Setting up email filters
- Configuring email forwarding rules
- Creating autoresponders
