= AWStats =

Web analytics reporting tool

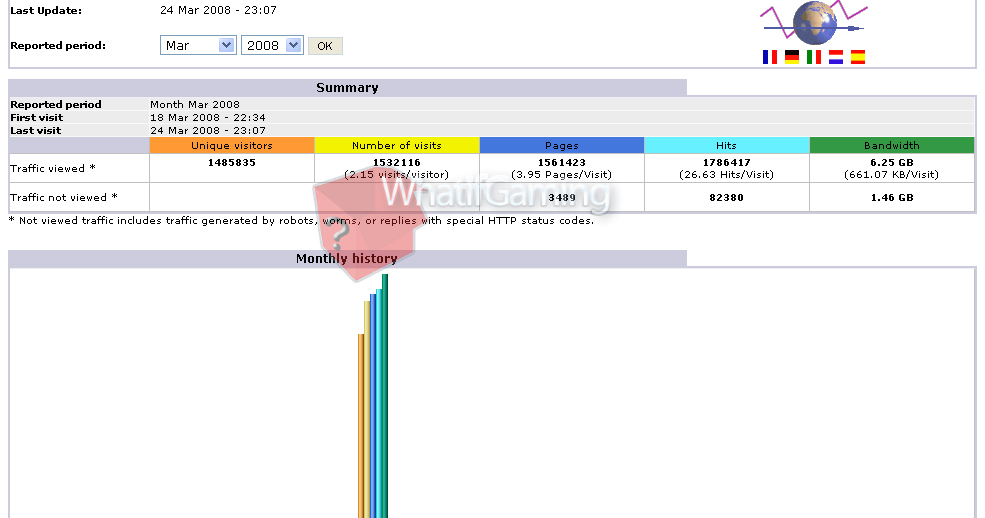
- Original author: Laurent Destailleur
- Release: May 2, 2000; 26 years ago
- Stable release: 8.0 / 26 August 2025; 14 months ago
- Written in: Perl
- Operating system: Cross-platform
- Type: Web analytics
- License: GNU General Public License
- Website: www.awstats.org
- Repository: github.com/eldy/awstats

AWStats (Advanced Web Statistics) is an open source Web analytics reporting tool, suitable for analyzing data from Internet services such as web, streaming media, mail, and FTP servers. AWStats parses and analyzes server log files, producing HTML reports. Data is visually presented within reports by tables and bar graphs. Static reports can be created through a command line interface, and on-demand reporting is supported through a Web browser CGI program.

AWStats supports most major web server log file formats including Apache (NCSA combined/XLF/ELF log format or Common Log Format (CLF)), WebStar, IIS (W3C log format), and many other common web server log formats.

Development was moved from SourceForge to GitHub in 2014.

== Cross-platform availability ==
Written in Perl, AWStats can be deployed on almost any operating system. It is a server-based website log analysis tool, with packages available for most Linux distributions. AWStats can be installed on a workstation, such as Microsoft Windows, for local use in situations where log files can be downloaded from a remote server.

== Licensing ==
AWStats is licensed under the GNU General Public License (GPL).

== Support ==
Proper web log analysis tool configuration and report interpretation requires a bit of technical and business knowledge. AWStats support resources include documentation and user community forums

== Security considerations ==
The on-demand CGI program has been the object of security exploits, as is the case of many CGI programs. Organizations wishing to provide public access to their Web analytics reports should consider generating static HTML reports. The on-demand facility can still be used by restricting its use to internal users. Precautions should be taken against referrer spam. Referrer spam filtering functionality was added in version 6.5.

== See also ==
- List of web analytics software
