= HTTP authentication =

HTTP authentication may refer to:

- Basic access authentication
- Digest access authentication
