= Pure-FTPd =

File transfer protocol server software

- Developer: PureFTPd Team
- Stable release: 1.0.54 / 28 April 2026; 51 days ago
- Operating system: Cross-platform
- Type: FTP Server
- License: ISC
- Website: www.pureftpd.org
- Repository: github.com/jedisct1/pure-ftpd

Pure-FTPd is a free (ISC license) FTP Server with a strong focus on software security. It can be compiled and run on a variety of Unix-like computer operating systems including Linux, OpenBSD, NetBSD, FreeBSD, DragonFly BSD, Solaris, Tru64, Darwin, Irix and HP-UX. It has also been ported to Android.

== History ==
Pure-FTPd is based on Troll-FTPd, written by Arnt Gulbrandsen while he was working at Trolltech from 1995 to 1999. When Gulbrandsen stopped maintaining Troll-FTPd, Frank Denis created Pure-FTPd in 2001, and it is currently developed by a team led by Denis.

== See also ==
- vsftpd
