= Extended Log Format =

Extended Log Format (ELF) is a standardized text file format that is used by web servers when generating log files. In comparison to the Common Log Format (CLF), ELF provides more information and flexibility.

== Example ==
#Version: 1.0
#Date: 12-Jan-1996 00:00:00
#Fields: time cs-method cs-uri
00:34:23 GET /foo/bar.html
12:21:16 GET /foo/bar.html
12:45:52 GET /foo/bar.html
12:57:34 GET /foo/bar.html

== See also ==
- Common Log Format

== Sources ==
- Extended Log File Format
- as described in the documentation of the World Wide Web consortia webserver (W3C httpd).
