= Vsftpd =

Free and open-source FTP server software for UNIX-like systems

vsftpd
- Developer: Chris Evans
- Stable release: 3.0.5 / August 2, 2021
- Operating system: Unix-like systems
- Type: FTP daemon
- License: GPL
- Website: security.appspot.com/vsftpd.html

vsftpd (or very secure FTP daemon) is an FTP server for Unix-like systems, including Linux. It is the default FTP server in the Ubuntu, CentOS, Fedora, NimbleX, Slackware and RHEL Linux distributions. It is licensed under the GNU General Public License. It supports IPv6, TLS and FTPS (explicit since 2.0.0 and implicit since 2.1.0).

== Compromised website ==
In July 2011, it was discovered that vsftpd version 2.3.4 downloadable from the master site had been compromised. Users logging into a compromised vsftpd-2.3.4 server may issue a ":)" smileyface as the username and gain a command shell on port 6200. This was not an issue of a security hole in the original version of vsftpd; instead, an unknown attacker had uploaded a different version of vsftpd which contained a backdoor. Since then, the site was moved to Google App Engine.

== See also ==
- Pure-FTPd
