= Kloxo =

Former server and hosted service management interface

- Developer: Kloxo Next Generation
- Stable release: 8.0.0
- Written in: PHP
- Platform: Linux
- Type: Control panel
- License: AGPL v3
- Website: kloxo.org
- Repository: github.com/KloxoNGCommunity/kloxo

Kloxo (formerly known as Lxadmin) was a free and open-source web hosting control panel for the Red Hat and CentOS Linux distributions. As of October 2017, the project has been unmaintained with a number of unresolved issues, and the project's website is offline.

Kloxo allows the host administrators to run a combination of lighttpd or Apache with djbdns or BIND, and provides a graphical interface to switch between these programs without losing data. Kloxo Enterprise can transparently move web/mail/dns from one server running Apache to another running lighttpd. It was formerly considered to be a good free alternative to cPanel hosting control panel.

Kloxo comes integrated with Installapp, which is a bundle of approximately 130 web applications that can be installed to the hosted websites. It is supported by Installatron – a third-party application installer (similar to Fantastico) as a plugin.

As of October 2017 the whole LxCenter website appears to be down with only the GitHub repository (and some forks) remaining with the last notable changes being three years old.

== Name change ==
Due to concerns about the appropriation of the name (Lxadmin) the name was replaced with Kloxo. There was an outcry from users as the name change involved a complete upgrade of file structures and it was about two weeks before there was an upgrade script for hosting companies.

== Security issues ==
In early June 2009, security related blogs and websites posted details of security loopholes in LxAdmin/Kloxo. Around this time, another piece of software created by the same vendor – HyperVM – was rumored to have been exploited in a massive attack at the British VAserv budget webhosting company. Crackers deleted the content of 100,000 hosted websites in one go, after gaining root access to the system. A detailed timeline of these events was posted several months later.

It is widely acknowledged by the hacker(s) and parties involved that the core exploit had to do with the administrator of those VPS's reusing the same password on all installs, and not utilizing the SSL security feature. Experts believe that this led to the transmission of the password in plain text, allowing hackers to sniff and exploit the host.

In early 2012 the message "DO NOT INSTALL THESE APPS. The applications included in InstallApp are outrageously out of date, and contain known and public security vulnerabilities. Enabling this feature on a live server exposes your server and users to serious security flaws" showed prominently at the top of the InstallApp page. This message was still there in January 2014.

In late 2012, a local privilege escalation exploit was found in Kloxo's lxsuexec and lxrestart programs, allowing an attacker to elevate privileges to root.

== Project history ==
While Kloxo initially started as a proprietary control panel, Internal issues arose within the company after the death of its CEO. It was later announced on July 10, 2009, that Kloxo and HyperVM would be continued in an open source consortium to be formed by Arthur Thornton, Danny Terweij, and S Bhargava. However, on October 25, 2009, Arthur Thornton officially resigned as the lead developer of Kloxo and HyperVM. Following his resignation, the HyperVM and Kloxo source code was officially released to the public. Arthur Thornton resumed his work on Kloxo and HyperVM in the background in mid-February 2010. As of May 2010, he is now back in the public and should soon be back full-time, though not as lead developer. Andre Allen became Project Manager at LxCenter in late February 2010, at the decision of Danny Terweij.

A fork of the project was created by Mustafa Ramadhan, entitled Kloxo_MR. Work was begun in late 2012 to add extra features to the project.

In September 2020, a new fork called Kloxo Next Generation (KloxoNG) was released as an upgrade pathway for existing Kloxo_MR users. KloxoNG is a rebuild of Kloxo_MR using the Fedora Copr build system. Later releases have included bug fixes and added support for PHP 7.4.

In August 2024, Kloxo Next Generation released Kloxo 8. Kloxo 8 is an upgrade of KloxoNG for RHEL 8 and RHEL 9 compatible OS, such as Rocky Linux and Alma Linux. Kloxo 8 includes the features of KloxoNG and added support of PHP 8.
