= Domain Technologie Control =

- Developer(s): GPLHost and its contributors, sponsored as well by iGlobalNetworks
- Operating system: Linux, FreeBSD, Mac OS X Server
- Available in: Chinese, English, Spanish, French, Dutch, German, Italian, Russian, Hungarian, Romanian, Polish and Latvian
- Type: Web hosting control panel
- License: Software: GNU LGPL v2.1 Graphics: GNU GPL v2
- Website: www.gplhost.com/software-dtc.html

Domain Technologie Control (DTC) was a web hosting control panel aimed at providing a graphics-oriented layout for managing commercial hosting of web servers, intended for shared web hosting servers, virtual private servers (VPSes), and dedicated servers. Domain Technologie Control is free software released under the GNU LGPL v2.1 license. It is fully skinnable and translated into several languages.

Domain Technologie Control allows the administrator to create web hosting plans that provide email and FTP accounts, domain purchasing, subdomains, SSH, and MySQL databases to the end users under controllable quota for the web sites that these users own. DTC also maintains the automation of billing, generates backup scripts, and monitors traffic (per user and per service) using a single system, UID or GID. Also integrated into DTC are the support ticket system and customizable HTTP error pages.

DTC itself manages its own MySQL database to store its setup configuration, web hosting plans, and users. It has support for many other free software: MySQL, Apache, PHP, qmail, Postfix, Courier, Dovecot, ProFTPd, Webalizer, mod-log-sql, and more. It also connects to dtc-xen to manage and monitor the usage of Virtual Private Servers (VPS).

DTC is fully open source (LGPL). DTC is also the first web hosting control panel that has reached inclusion in major distributions like Debian (since Lenny in 2009), Ubuntu (since 2008) and FreeBSD.

== See also ==
- Comparison of web hosting control panels
