= CloudLinux OS =

Linux distribution

- Developer: CloudLinux, Inc.
- OS family: Linux (Unix-like)
- Working state: Current
- Initial release: January 2010; 16 years ago
- Latest release: 10 / October 2025; 1 year ago
- Available in: English
- Kernel type: Monolithic kernel
- Official website: cloudlinux.com

CloudLinux OS is a commercial Linux distribution marketed to shared hosting providers. It is developed by software company CloudLinux, Inc. and is based on AlmaLinux, which is in turn based on Red Hat Enterprise Linux.

== Overview ==
CloudLinux OS was at first based on the CentOS operating system, which was discontinued in 2020. Since shortly after AlmaLinux's first release in 2021, CloudLinux OS has been based on AlmaLinux, a Red Hat Enterprise Linux-compatible distribution.

CloudLinux OS provides a modified kernel based on the OpenVZ kernel. The main feature is the Lightweight Virtual Environment (LVE) – a separate environment with its own CPU, memory, IO, IOPS, number of processes and other limits. The RPM package manager is used, and Flatpak deployments are also supported.

Switching to CloudLinux OS is performed by a provided cldeploy script which installs its kernel, switches yum repositories and installs basic packages to allow LVE to work. After installation the server requires rebooting to load the newly installed kernel. CloudLinux OS does not modify existing packages, so it is possible to boot the previous kernel in the regular way. CloudLinux 10, launched in October 2025, no longer provides installation images; instead, the cldeploy script converts an existing AlmaLinux installation into CloudLinux OS.

== Related products ==
=== AlmaLinux ===
CloudLinux released the first beta for AlmaLinux OS, a free operating system intended as a substitute for CentOS, on February 1, 2021. On March 30, 2021, the same day as the first stable release, CloudLinux transferred the responsibility for development and governance of the project to the AlmaLinux OS Foundation. CloudLinux promised $1 million in annual funding to the project, but does not own the project any more. After Red Hat restricted public access to Red Hat Enterprise Linux source code in 2023, AlmaLinux began building from CentOS Stream sources while targeting application binary interface compatibility.

=== AccelerateWP ===
Hosting providers using CloudLinux often offer the WordPress content management system to their customers. In 2022, CloudLinux developed the AccelerateWP suite of tools to diagnose slow WordPress websites and improve their performance, largely through caching.
