= AlmaLinux =

Linux distribution based on Red Hat Enterprise Linux

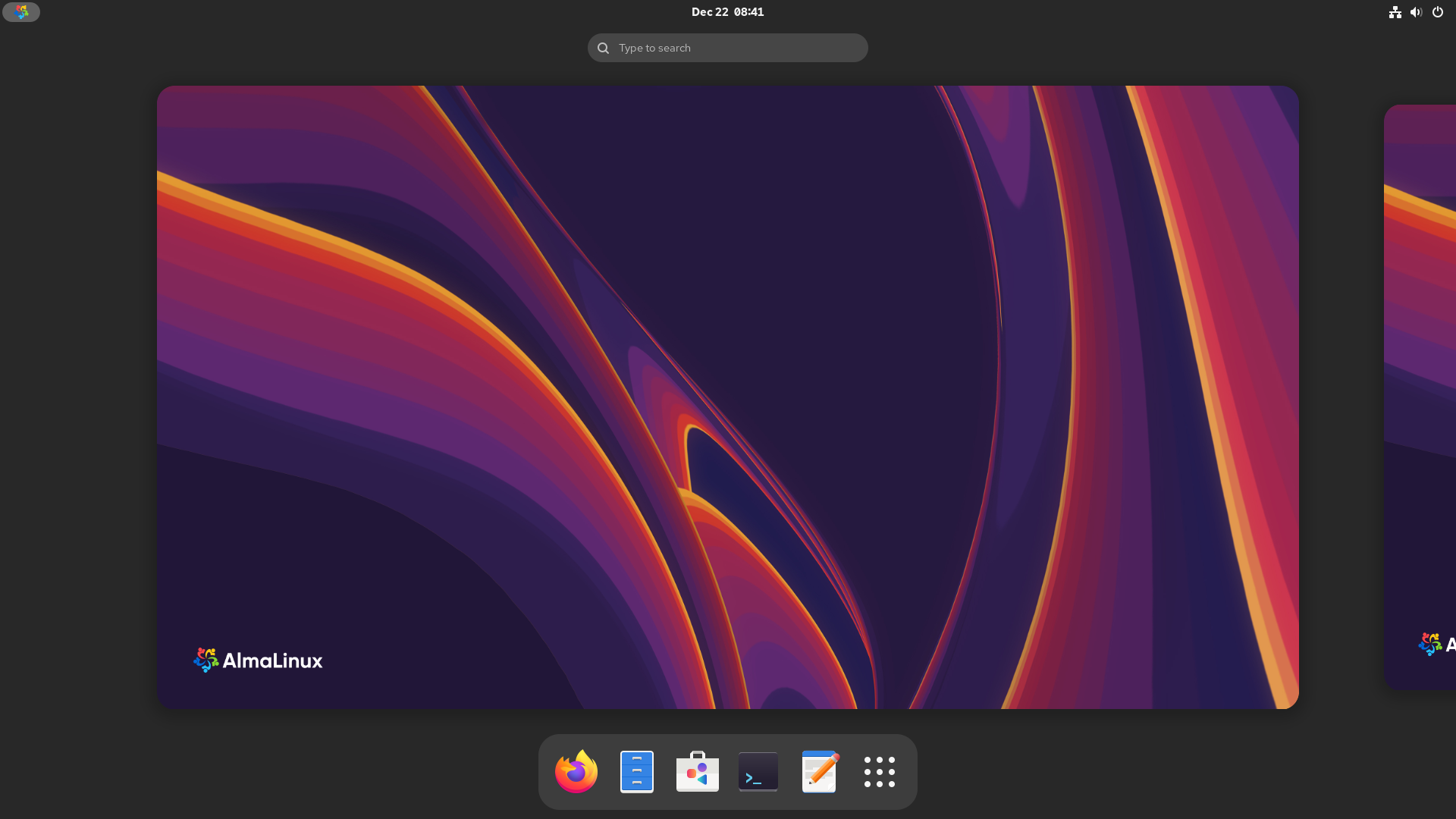
- Screenshot of default desktop on AlmaLinux version 10.0, with GNOME 47.
- Developer: The AlmaLinux OS Foundation
- Written in: C (kernel)
- OS family: Linux (Unix-like)
- Working state: Current
- Source model: Open source
- Initial release: 30 March 2021 (5 years ago)
Latest release
- 10: 10.3 / 16 November 2026 (0 days ago)
- 9: 9.9 / 16 November 2026 (0 days ago)
- 8: 8.10 / 28 May 2024 (2 years ago)
- Repository: github.com/AlmaLinux
- Marketing target: Servers, desktop computers, workstations, supercomputers
- Update method: DNF
- Package manager: RPM
- Supported platforms: x86-64, AArch64, ppc64le, s390x
- Kernel type: Monolithic (Linux kernel)
- Userland: GNU
- Default user interface: GNOME Shell, Bash
- License: GPLv2 and others
- Preceded by: CentOS
- Official website: almalinux.org

AlmaLinux is a free and open source Linux distribution, a community-supported, production-grade enterprise operating system that is binary-compatible with Red Hat Enterprise Linux (RHEL). The name of the distribution comes from the word "alma", meaning "soul" in Spanish and other Latin languages. It was chosen to be a homage to the Linux community. It is developed by the American AlmaLinux OS Foundation, a 501(c) organization.

The first stable release of AlmaLinux was published on 30 March 2021, and will be supported until 1 March 2029. AlmaLinux is built using publicly-viewable and reproducible methods using the AlmaLinux Build System (ALBS), which is a customized build system whose source code, like the distribution itself, is publicly distributed and licensed under open-source licenses.

== History ==
On December 8, 2020, Red Hat announced that development of CentOS, a free-of-cost downstream fork of the commercial Red Hat Enterprise Linux (RHEL), would be discontinued and its official support would be cut short to focus on CentOS Stream, a stable long term service release without minor point releases that is officially used by Red Hat to preview what is intended for inclusion in updates to RHEL. In response, CloudLinux—which maintains its own commercial Linux distribution, CloudLinux OS—announced that it would back AlmaLinux to provide a community-supported spiritual successor to CentOS Linux, aiming for binary-compatibility with the current version of RHEL.

A beta version of AlmaLinux was first released on February 1, 2021, and the first stable release of AlmaLinux was published on 30 March 2021. AlmaLinux 8.x will be supported until 2029. Numerous companies, such as ARM, AWS, Equinix, and Microsoft, also support AlmaLinux.

On 30 March 2021, the AlmaLinux OS Foundation was created as a 501(c) organization to take over AlmaLinux development and governance from CloudLinux, which promised $1 million in annual funding to the project. In October 2021, Igor Seletskiy, the CEO of CloudLinux and then chair of the board, stepped down to allow AlmaLinux to continue as a community-led operating system, and the board chose Benny Vasquez as the new chair. Following the release of AlmaLinux 8.6, on June 20, 2022, the AlmaLinux OS Foundation released the AlmaLinux Build System (ALBS). In September 2022, the AlmaLinux OS Foundation held its first election, announcing a board of seven community-elected members on September 19.

In December 2022, it was announced that CERN and Fermilab would provide AlmaLinux as the standard operating system for their experiments.

Three weeks after Red Hat's announcement in June 2023 of new restrictions on their code, AlmaLinux replied in a blog post that "the AlmaLinux OS Foundation board today has decided to drop the aim to be 1:1 with RHEL. AlmaLinux OS will instead aim to be binary compatible with RHEL".

In September 2023 the Foundation announced they would expand the board, and in December 2023 the AlmaLinux OS Foundation held their second election and announced Alejandro Iribarren of CERN and Jun Yoshida of Cybertrust Japan would be joining the board.

== Project ELevate ==
In September 2021, the AlmaLinux project announced a tool called ELevate that would allow in-place upgrades between major versions of enterprise Linux distributions. "ELevate is developed in a distribution agnostic way and is built as a tool for the whole ecosystem, not just AlmaLinux. ELevate supports migrating to/from other distributions and is open for all to contribute to and enhance." In January 2024 they expanded the tool to include support for additional repositories, and in April 2024 they added support for upgrading from CentOS 6 to CentOS 7, allowing some to upgrade in place from CentOS 6 through an enterprise Linux version 9 distribution of their choice.

== Build system ==
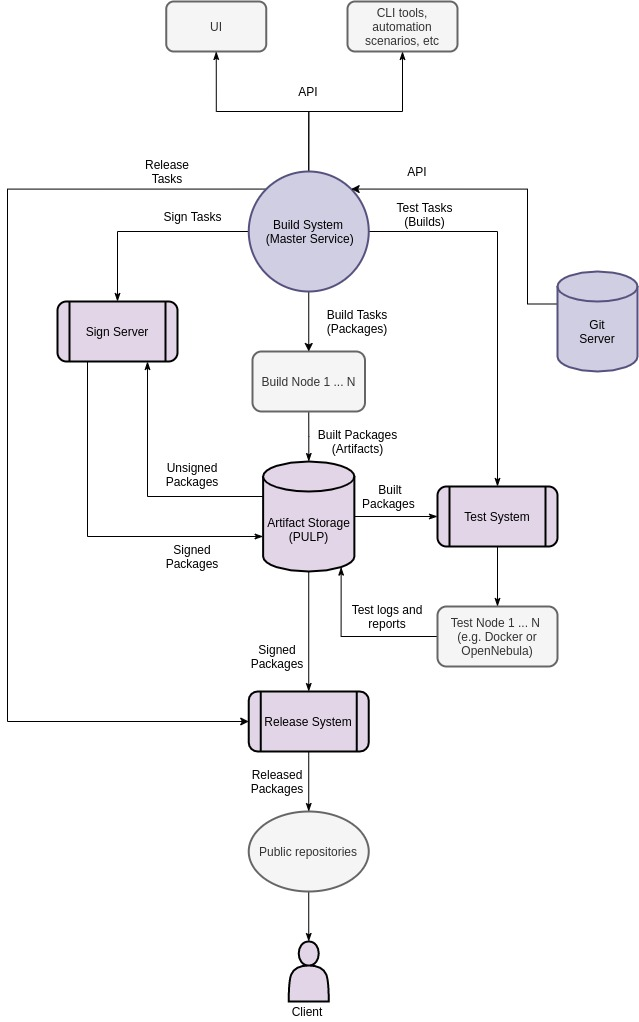
A diagram of the AlmaLinux Build System (ALBS)

The AlmaLinux Build System, commonly shortened to "ALBS", is the build system of AlmaLinux. It was first used to release version 8.6 (Sky Tiger), and has the capability of automating builds for the x86-64, AArch64, ppc64, and S390x architectures. The ALBS consists of five components: the Git Service, Release System, Sign Server, Test System, Build Node. Each component is governed by an overarching component known as the "Master Service", which is intended to be controlled via its own API.

=== Git Service ===
AlmaLinux's source code is directly sourced from Git code repositories of software packages that comprise Red Hat Enterprise Linux. Using a "listener" that monitors changes to existing repositories or additions of new repositories, the AlmaLinux Git Service pulls source code to its own publicly-available Gitea server instance. This public server's web interface also provides a view of build pipelines for each package. In addition, the service exposes an API that allows repositories to be directly consumed by the rest of ALBS.

=== Build Node ===
Corresponding with the Master Service, the Build Node's purpose is to perform the compilation of source code stored in the Git repositories to create RPM packages that can later be used as part of the distribution installation process. As artifacts of the build process, these pieces have a dedicated storage from which they can be further processed.

=== Test System ===
The AlmaLinux Test System (ALTS) tests RPM packages that exist as build artifacts. Using containerization, packages are given dedicated environments for which test suites can be exercised.

=== Release System and Sign Server ===
In order to ensure integrity, each software package that is released for the AlmaLinux distribution is digitally-signed using the Pretty Good Privacy (PGP) cryptographic algorithm. The Sign Server takes artifacts created from the Build Node, signs them, and returns them back to artifact storage. From there, the Release System can upload them to release repositories.

== AlmaLinux OS Kitten and the AlmaLinux build pipeline ==
Prior to June 2023's source code change by Red Hat, AlmaLinux rebuilt RHEL using public sources provided by Red Hat. After AlmaLinux opted to shift their focus to remaining RHEL compatible, they first released bug and security flaw fixes ahead of Red Hat the next month with patches for Zenbleed. They started to differentiate themselves further from Red Hat with the AlmaLinux 8.10 and 9.4 releases in May 2024 by re-enabling hardware support that was disabled in RHEL's equivalent releases.

In October 2024 the AlmaLinux project announced AlmaLinux OS Kitten. "Earlier this year we started setting up infrastructure and the build pipeline for AlmaLinux OS 10, and started testing using CentOS Stream 10’s code. Based on this preparation work, we are excited to share that we have successfully built a preview of AlmaLinux OS 10 that we are calling AlmaLinux OS Kitten 10." Kitten 10's release also showed the additional features that AlmaLinux was adding for its community, including KVM support for IBM POWER and SPICE support.

In December 2024, AlmaLinux announced the AlmaLinux OS 10 beta, which included all of those features, but was different from Kitten, as it follows Red Hat's software versions, instead of CentOS Stream. "The astute AlmaLinux user will notice that some of the software versions in AlmaLinux OS Kitten 10 are newer than what you will find in the AlmaLinux 10 beta release. That is because Kitten is based on CentOS Stream, and AlmaLinux 10 follows Red Hat 10’s release versions. It should not be anticipated that Kitten is or will be exactly what will be provided in the BETA version."

== Releases ==
AlmaLinux releases
AlmaLinux version	Codename	Architectures	RHEL base	Kernel	AlmaLinux release date	RHEL release date	Delay (days)
10.3	Mauve Lion	x86-64, ARM64, ppc64le, s390x	10.3	6.12.0-264.16.1	2026-11-16	2026-11-11	5
10.2	Lavender Lion	x86-64, ARM64, ppc64le, s390x	10.2	6.12.0-211.7.3	2026-05-26	2026-05-19	7
10.1	Heliotrope Lion	x86-64, ARM64, ppc64le, s390x	10.1	6.12.0-124.8.1	2025-11-24	2025-11-11	13
10.0	Purple Lion	x86-64, ARM64, ppc64le, s390x	10.0	6.12.0-55.9.1	2025-05-27	2025-05-20	7
9.9	Chartreuse Bobcat	x86-64, ARM64, ppc64le, s390x	9.9	5.14.0-741.22.1	2026-11-16	2026-11-11	5
9.8	Olive Jaguar	x86-64, ARM64, ppc64le, s390x	9.8	5.14.0-687.5.3	2026-05-26	2026-05-19	7
9.7	Moss Jungle Cat	x86-64, ARM64, ppc64le, s390x	9.7	5.14.0-611.5.1	2025-11-17	2025-11-11	6
9.6	Sage Margay	x86-64, ARM64, ppc64le, s390x	9.6	5.14.0-570.12.1	2025-05-20	2025-05-20	0
9.5	Teal Serval	x86-64, ARM64, ppc64le, s390x	9.5	5.14.0-503.11.1	2024-11-18	2024-11-13	5
9.4	Seafoam Ocelot	x86-64, ARM64, ppc64le, s390x	9.4	5.14.0-427.13.1	2024-05-06	2024-04-30	6
9.3	Shamrock Pampas Cat	x86-64, ARM64, ppc64le, s390x	9.3	5.14.0-362.8.1	2023-11-13	2023-11-07	6
9.2	Turquoise Kodkod	x86-64, ARM64, ppc64le, s390x	9.2	5.14.0-284.11.1	2023-05-10	2023-05-10	0
9.1	Lime Lynx	x86-64, ARM64, ppc64le, s390x	9.1	5.14.0-162.6.1	2022-11-17	2022-11-15	2
9.0	Emerald Puma	x86-64, ARM64, ppc64le, s390x	9.0	5.14.0-70.13.1	2022-05-26	2022-05-17	9
8.10	Cerulean Leopard	x86-64, ARM64, ppc64le, s390x	8.10	4.18.0-553	2024-05-28	2024-05-22	6
8.9	Midnight Oncilla	x86-64, ARM64, ppc64le, s390x	8.9	4.18.0-513.5.1	2023-11-21	2023-11-14	7
8.8	Sapphire Caracal	x86-64, ARM64, ppc64le, s390x	8.8	4.18.0-477	2023-05-18	2023-05-16	1
8.7	Stone Smilodon	x86-64, ARM64, ppc64le, s390x	8.7	4.18.0-425	2022-11-10	2022-11-09	1
8.6	Sky Tiger	x86-64, ARM64, ppc64le, s390x	8.6	4.18.0-372	2022-05-12	2022-05-10	2
8.5	Arctic Sphynx	x86-64, ARM64, ppc64le	8.5	4.18.0-348	2021-11-12, 2022-02-25	2021-11-09	3
8.4	Electric Cheetah	x86-64, ARM64	8.4	4.18.0-305	2021-05-26	2021-05-18	8
8.3	Purple Manul	x86-64	8.3	4.18.0-240	2021-03-30	2020-11-03	147 / 110 (Note: AlmaLinux was announced 10 December 2020, first beta release was 53 days later.)
Legend: Unsupported Supported Latest version

== See also ==
- Red Hat Enterprise Linux#Product life cycle
- Red Hat Enterprise Linux derivatives
- Fedora Linux
