= CPanel =

Web-hosting control software

cPanel
- Original author: J. Nick Koston
- Developers: cPanel, L.L.C. (a subsidiary of WebPros)
- Release: March 21, 1996; 30 years ago
- Stable release: 136 / April 2026
- Written in: Perl, PHP, C/C++, JavaScript
- Middleware: Apache, Exim, Dovecot, ProFTPD, Nginx, MariaDB
- Operating system: AlmaLinux 8 / 9 / 10, CloudLinux OS 8 / 9, Ubuntu 22.04 / 24.04 LTS
- Platform: x86-64; Linux
- Available in: Multilingual
- Type: Web hosting control panel
- License: Proprietary
- Website: www.cpanel.net

cPanel is a web hosting control panel software developed by cPanel, L.L.C., a company based in the United States, and owned by WebPros. It provides a graphical user interface (GUI) and automation tools designed to simplify website and server management for end users. The software enables administration through a standard web browser and is commonly used alongside WebHost Manager (WHM), which allows server-level management.

cPanel supports command-line and API access for automation and integration with third-party applications. It is designed to operate on dedicated servers and virtual private servers, and supports operating systems including AlmaLinux, CloudLinux OS, and Ubuntu.

As of 2019, it was reported to manage over 70 million domains across more than 70 countries. According to W3Techs, it holds approximately 12.7% of the web hosting control panel market as of 2021.

== History ==
cPanel is developed by cPanel, L.L.C., a privately held company headquartered in Houston, Texas, United States. It was originally created in 1996 by J. Nick Koston for Speed Hosting, a now-defunct web hosting company. After the merger of Speed Hosting with Webking, the software continued to be used by the combined entity, which later operated from Virtual Development Inc (VDI).

Under an agreement with VDI, cPanel was made available exclusively to customers hosted on its servers. At the time, the control panel market had limited competition, with VDI and Alabanza among the primary providers.

In 1999, cPanel 3 was released, introducing features such as automatic updates and the Web Host Manager (WHM). The interface of cPanel 3 was later redesigned, including contributions from Carlos Rego of WizardsHosting, which resulted in a more intuitive user interface than earlier versions.

After a dispute between VDI and cPanel's creator, J. Nick Koston, development was split. VDI continued a separate version known as WebPanel, while Koston retained and developed cPanel independently. Koston continued development alongside his work at BurstNET before leaving the company to focus entirely on cPanel.

In 2011, cPanel University, a certification and training programme designed to assess and develop user proficiency in cPanel, was launched.

It had Enkompass, a Microsoft Windows version of cPanel, which was later made free following a slowdown in development. It was discontinued in February 2014.

In August 2018, cPanel, L.L.C. was acquired by WebPros BV, a holding company controlled by Oakley Capital Private Equity Fund III, which acquired a majority stake from founder J. Nick Koston, and Oakley Capital made an additional $50 million investment as part of the transaction.

In December 2019, WebPros, the parent company of cPanel, came under the ownership of CVC Capital Partners’ Fund VII, with Oakley Capital reinvesting as a minority partner alongside CVC.

In August 2019, cPanel partnered with CloudLinux to extend support for systems running Red Hat Enterprise Linux 6 and CentOS 6 through CloudLinux OS 6, with support extended until June 2024. In March 2022, cPanel version 102 added full support for Ubuntu Long Term Support (LTS) releases, extending compatibility beyond CentOS-based systems.

In October 2023, it introduced a "Manage Team" feature that allows account owners to create sub-accounts with delegated access and implement additional security controls such as user-level permissions and authentication requirements.

cPanel Releases
Version	Release date
54	2016-01-04
56	2016-04-11
58	2016-07-11
60	2016-10-11
62	2017-01-05
64	2017-03-27
66	2017-07-12
68	2017-10-12
70	2018-01-23
72	2018-06-11
74	2018-07-17
76	2018-10-16
78	2019-01-15
80	2019-05-09
82	2019-07-08
84	2019-10-07
86	2020-01-30
88	2020-05-07
90	2020-07-27
92	2020-10-29
94	2021-02-02
96	2021-04-07
98	2021-07-14
100	2021-11-15
102	2022-01-20
104	2022-05-11
106	2022-09-01
108	2023-02-06
110	2023-04-03
112	2023-06-12
114	2023-08-28
116	2023-11-30
118	2024-03-04
120	2024-04-09
122	2024-08-19
124	2024-10-10
126	2025-01-21
128	2025-03-27
130	2025-07-02
132	2025-09-30
134	2026-01-07
136	2026-04-07
Legend	Old version Old version, still maintained Latest version

== Features ==
cPanel provides a web-based interface for managing web hosting environments, including tools for file management, email and domain administration, and common administrative tasks such as management of PGP keys, crontab tasks, FTP accounts, and mailing lists. It also includes functionality for database management and is widely used by web hosting providers.

It supports operating systems such as AlmaLinux, CloudLinux, and Ubuntu, and includes migration tools for transferring websites between servers and from other control panels.

Other features include remote backup support with services such as Amazon S3, Google Drive, and FTP, two-factor authentication, antivirus integration (such as ClamAV), and clustering for distributing workloads across multiple servers.

=== Extensions and add-ons ===
It supports additional software extensions, including auto-installers such as Installatron, Fantastico, and Softaculous, as well as applications such as WHMSonic, which can be enabled by a server administrator through WHM.

== Technology ==
cPanel operates with support for web servers such as Nginx and LiteSpeed, databases including MySQL and MariaDB, and programming languages such as PHP, Java, and Ruby, with additional components configurable based on the hosting environment.

WHM manages certain software packages independently of the underlying operating system, including Apache, PHP, MySQL, MariaDB, Exim, and FTP services, and applies updates to maintain compatibility with the platform.

== WHM ==
WebHost Manager (WHM) is a web-based tool used for server administration alongside cPanel. It provides different access levels, including root access for server administrators and reseller-level access for managing hosting accounts.

WHM is used to create and manage cPanel accounts, configure hosting packages, and manage DNS zones, SSL certificates, and server settings. It also allows administrators to manage services such as FTP, email, and SSH, and to oversee multiple hosting accounts on a server.

== Licensing and pricing ==
Prior to 2019, cPanel licences were sold on a per-server basis, with pricing independent of the number of accounts on a server. The model included tiers such as cPanel Solo, cPanel and WHM VPS, and a dedicated server licence. In June 2019, cPanel introduced account-based pricing, replacing the per-server model and applying limits on the number of accounts per licence tier.

In 2020, the move to account-based pricing was reported to affect web hosting providers, who were expected to adjust their pricing models.

== Security incidents ==
In 2009, security researchers identified a cross-site request forgery (CSRF) issue affecting cPanel, for which the company indicated that mitigation measures were being developed and introduced in subsequent updates. In December 2009, phishing campaigns were observed using webpages resembling the cPanel interface to obtain website administration credentials.

In February 2013, cPanel reported that a support-related proxy server had been accessed by an unauthorised party, after which the company advised certain users to update their credentials and added additional security measures.

In January 2016, cPanel stated that it had mitigated a potential breach of a customer database containing user information, and subsequently required password resets while accelerating enhancements to its encryption standards. In November 2020, a security vulnerability affecting two-factor authentication (2FA) in certain older versions of cPanel and WHM was identified by researchers and later addressed through software updates released by the company.

In April 2026, a severe vulnerability was discovered that affected all cPanel and WHM versions after 11.40, affectively allowing unauthenticated remote attackers to access the control panel. According to some web hosters the vulnerability was already being actively exploited, with some attempts even dating back to late February 2026.

== Reception ==
In 2025, Lewis Wright of TechRadar, in a review, gave cPanel a rating of 4 out of 5, noting its familiarity and portability.

== See also ==
- Comparison of web hosting control panels
- Plesk
