= Plesk =

Web hosting and data center automation software

- Original author: Dimitri Simonenko
- Developer: Plesk
- Release: 1999
- Written in: PHP, C++, C#, Java
- Engine: Nginx
- Operating system: Linux, Windows Server
- Available in: 32 languages
- List of languages English, Arabic, Catalan, Chinese (Simplified & Traditional), Czech, Danish, Dutch, Finnish, French, German, Greek, Hebrew, Hungarian, Indonesian, Italian, Japanese, Korean, Malay, Norwegian, Polish, Portuguese (Brazilian & European), Romanian, Russian, Spanish, Swedish, Tagalog, Thai, Turkish, Ukrainian, Vietnamese
- Type: Web hosting control panel
- License: Proprietary
- Website: www.plesk.com
- As of: 2026

Plesk is commercial web hosting and server data center automation software developed for Linux and Windows-based retail hosting service providers.

It was developed by Plesk International GmbH, a company headquartered in Schaffhausen, Switzerland, with offices in Toronto, Canada, Barcelona, Spain, Cologne, Germany, and Tokyo, Japan, and was created in 2000 by Dimitri Simonenko.

According to W3Techs, Plesk was used by 42.3% of websites with a detectable web hosting control panel in August 2026, compared with 53.1% for hPanel and 2.0% for cPanel.

== History ==
Plesk was developed in Novosibirsk, Russia, by Dimitri Simonenko and his team around 1999–2000. An initial version of the software for Linux-based web servers was released in 1999, providing a graphical interface for managing web servers, including websites and email accounts. Plesk was subsequently commercialised by Plesk Inc. and released its server-administration software in February 2000.

In 2003, SWsoft acquired Plesk and Confixx, another web hosting control-panel software company. The acquisitions brought Plesk Server Administrator and Confixx Professional into SWsoft's portfolio of hosting software.

In December 2007, SWsoft announced that it would change its corporate name to Parallels, bringing its server and desktop virtualization products under a single brand. The change took effect in January 2008.

In March 2015, Parallels rebranded its Service Provider business unit as Odin, while Plesk and Virtuozzo continued under the Parallels group. In December 2015, Ingram Micro acquired Odin Service Automation, including its associated cloud-management technologies, intellectual property and brand. Plesk and Virtuozzo were separated from the Odin business and structured as standalone companies under their respective brands.

In May 2017, Oakley Capital, a British private equity firm acquired the assets and operations of Plesk from the Parallels Group at an enterprise value of $105 million. The transaction was structured as a carve-out, with the fund acquiring a 51% controlling stake in the business.

In July 2017, Plesk acquired XOVI, a German search engine optimisation software company. In June 2018, it acquired SolusVM, a VPS management system, from OnApp.

In December 2019, CVC Capital Partners agreed to acquire a controlling stake in WebPros Group, which included Plesk, from Oakley Capital and other existing investors. The acquisition was completed in February 2020, with CVC holding the controlling interest and Oakley Capital remaining a minority investor.

In May 2020, Plesk launched SolusIO, a virtual infrastructure management platform for VPS and cloud hosting.

== Features ==
Plesk provides a graphical interface for managing web servers, websites, domains, email accounts, databases and applications. It supports both Linux and Windows Server, and can be used with web servers including Apache and NGINX. It supports databases such as MySQL, MariaDB, PostgreSQL and Microsoft SQL Server, as well as programming environments including PHP, Node.js, Python, Ruby and .NET.

The platform provides tools for domain and DNS management, email accounts, databases, file management, application installation, backups and SSL/TLS certificates. It also supports extensions that add functionality for services and applications.

Plesk includes the WordPress Toolkit, which provides a central interface for installing and managing WordPress websites, including updates, plugin and theme management, cloning and security checks. The toolkit also supports staging and migration workflows.

== Licenses ==
Plesk is distributed through subscription-based licenses in three editions, Web Admin, Web Pro and Web Host. Web Admin supports up to 10 domains, Web Pro up to 30 domains, and Web Host supports unlimited domains and provides reseller management features.

Plesk licenses are available for virtual private servers and dedicated servers, with monthly and yearly lease options.

== Version history ==
Product	Released	Extended Support	End of Life
Plesk Obsidian (18.x)	4 June 2019 (initial); rolling releases thereafter	Two most recent releases	—N/a (current)
Plesk Onyx (17.x)	October–November 2016 (stable: March 2017)	11 October 2020	20 April 2021
Plesk 12	16 June 2014	16 June 2018	1 January 2019
Plesk 11	13 June 2012	13 June 2016	13 December 2016
Plesk 10	3 November 2010	31 January 2015	3 May 2015
Plesk 9	9 December 2008	9 December 2012	9 June 2013
Plesk 8	20 September 2006	1 March 2012	September 2012
Small Business Panel	November 2009	1 August 2011	July 2012
Plesk 7 and earlier	10 February 2004	—N/a	1 January 2012
Plesk for Linux (initial)	1999	—N/a	—N/a

== Security ==
Plesk includes security features such as ModSecurity, a web application firewall, and Fail2Ban, which can block IP addresses after repeated failed authentication attempts. Plesk also supports multi-factor authentication for user accounts.

Plesk has also been affected by security vulnerabilities. In 2012, a vulnerability in Plesk Panel was exploited in attacks that compromised websites hosted on affected servers. SecurityWeek reported that the vulnerability had been used to compromise about 50,000 domains and that Plesk versions 10.4 and earlier were affected. In another 2012 incident, Cisco researchers linked exploitation of a Plesk Webmail vulnerability to attacks that enabled unauthorized access to affected servers.

== Criticisms ==
In 2025, The Register reported that IONOS increased the price of some of its virtual private server plans by £5 per month per Plesk licence, excluding VAT, citing higher licensing costs from WebPros International. Some IONOS customers criticised the increase for being introduced during existing contracts and for the relatively short notice given to customers.

== Reception ==
A review by Lewis Wright for TechRadar in 2025 gave Plesk a rating of 4.5 out of 5 stars. Wright praised its ease of use, documentation and user interface, and described it as the "go to choice for Windows servers". He also noted its support for Linux and Windows, website builder, mobile app and range of extensions. The review found Plesk relatively expensive for smaller servers and considered its interface less suited to users who wanted greater access to underlying technical details than cPanel.

In 2026, a review by Romain Cochard for Hack'celeration gave it an overall score of 3.5 out of 5. The review praised its feature set, support for both Linux and Windows, WordPress Toolkit and range of integrations, while criticizing its pricing and customer support.

In 2019, CRN magazine listed Plesk among the 20 Coolest Cloud Platform Vendors in its Cloud 100 list.

== See also ==
- cPanel
- Web hosting control panel
- Comparison of web hosting control panels
