= Web hosting control panel =

Web application to manage servers

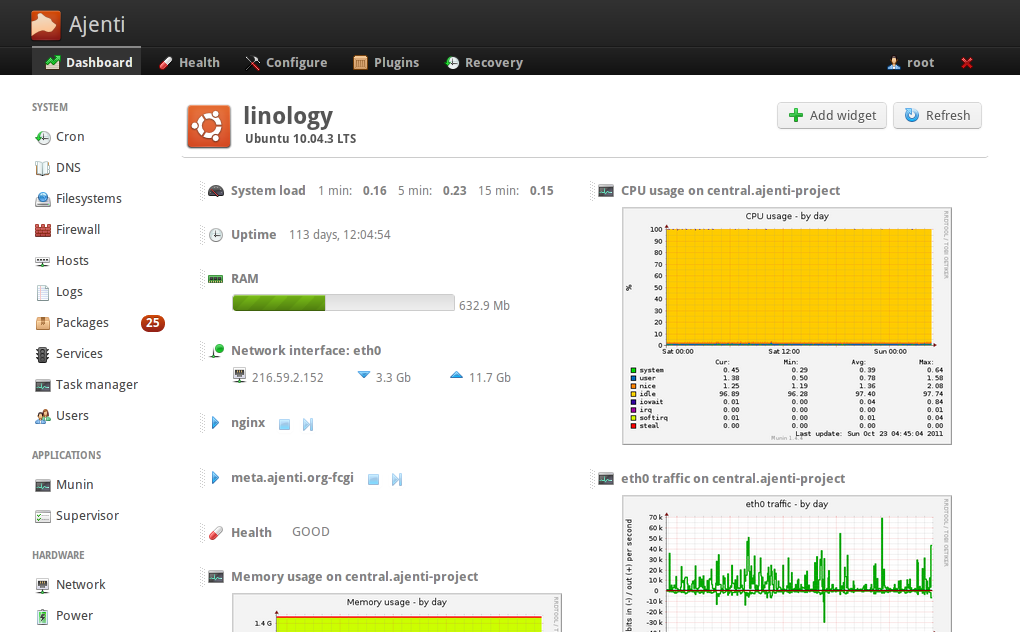
Screenshot of a web hosting control panel, Ajenti

A web hosting control panel is a web-based interface provided by a web hosting service that allows users to manage their servers and hosted services. Examples include cPanel, Plesk, Eenos, ispmanager, My20i, CloudPanel, OpenPanel, and Enhance. For more examples, see comparison of web hosting control panels.

Web hosting control panels can include the following modules:

- Web server (e.g. Apache HTTP Server, Nginx, Internet Information Services)
- Domain Name System server
- Mail server, spam filter, and Webmail
- File Transfer Protocol server
- Database
- File manager
- System monitor
- Web log analysis software
- Firewall
- phpMyAdmin
- Content Delivery Network
