= List of web analytics software =

This is a list of web analytics software used to collect and display data about visiting website users.

Name	Organization	Supported databases	Tracking method	Latest stable release	License
Adobe Analytics	Adobe Systems	Unknown	Cookies via JavaScript	N/A	Proprietary
Analog	Unknown	Logfile-based	Web log files	6.0.17	GNU GPL
Analytics Suite	AT Internet	Unknown	Mobile ID and Cookies	Continuous	Proprietary
AWStats	Unknown	Logfile-based	Web log files	8.0	GNU GPL
Bing Webmaster Tools	Microsoft	Unknown	Cookies via JavaScript	N/A	Proprietary
CleverTap	WizRocket, Inc.	Unknown	Cookies via JavaScript	Continuous	Proprietary
Data Workbench	Adobe Systems	Unknown	Cookies via JavaScript	6.51	Proprietary
GoAccess	Unknown	Logfile-based	Web log files	1.10.2	MIT
Google Analytics	Google	Unknown	Cookies via JavaScript	N/A	Proprietary
LiveChat	Livechat Software	Unknown	Cookies via JavaScript	N/A	Proprietary
Matomo	Unknown	MariaDB, MySQL	JavaScript, Web log files	5.11.2	GNU GPL
Marfeel	Marfeel Solutions S.L.	Unknown	Cookies via JavaScript	N/A	Proprietary
Mixpanel	Mixpanel	Unknown	Cookies via JavaScript	N/A	Proprietary
Octopussy	Unknown	MariaDB, MySQL, Logfile-based	Web log files (via Syslog)	1.0.16	GNU GPL
Open Web Analytics	Unknown	AWS Aurora, MariaDB, MySQL	JavaScript or PHP pagetag	1.8.1	GNU GPL
Plausible Analytics	Plausible Insights OÜ	PostgreSQL, ClickHouse	JavaScript	3.2.1	AGPL-3.0
Sawmill	Flowerfire Inc	MS SQL/MySQL/Oracle Database/PostgreSQL/Proprietary	Web log files	8.8.0	Proprietary
Similarweb	Similarweb Ltd.	Unknown	Cookies via JavaScript	N/A	Proprietary
Splunk	Splunk Inc.	Proprietary	Web log files	6.2.1	Proprietary
StatCounter	StatCounter	Unknown	Cookies via JavaScript	N/A	Proprietary
Tealeaf CX	IBM	MS SQL/Proprietary	Network traffic monitor	8.4	Proprietary
Unica NetInsight	IBM	MS SQL/IBM Db2/Oracle Database/Netezza	Web log files & Cookies (with or without JavaScript)	8.6	Proprietary
Urchin	Google	MySQL, PostgreSQL	Cookies & Logs	7.200	Proprietary
W3Perl	Unknown	Logfile-based	Web log files	3.20	GNU GPL
Webalizer	Unknown	Logfile-based	Web log files		GNU GPL
Webtrekk Q3	Webtrekk	Unknown	Cookies via JavaScript	N/A	Proprietary
Webtrends	Webtrends	Unknown	Cookies via JavaScript	N/A	Proprietary
Woopra	iFusion Labs LLC	Unknown	Cookies via JavaScript	1.2	Proprietary
Yahoo! Web Analytics	Yahoo!	Unknown	Cookies via JavaScript	Not available anymore	Proprietary
Yandex.Metrica	Yandex	Unknown	Cookies via JavaScript	N/A	Proprietary
