= Scalyr =

Dataset, Inc.
- Company type: Private
- Founded: 2011; 15 years ago
- Headquarters: San Mateo, California, U.S.
- Key people: Christine Heckart (CEO)
- Industry: Enterprise software
- Services: Log management and intelligence, Log analysis
- Website: www.scalyr.com

Dataset Inc., formerly known as Scalyr, Inc., is a server log monitoring tool provider based in San Mateo, California. It was incorporated in 2011 and was founded by Steve Newman, the former chief engineer and founder of Writely, whose technology was acquired and became Google Docs. Led by CEO Christine Heckart, the company offers an integrated suite of server monitoring, log management, visualization and analysis tools that aggregates all the metrics into a centralized system in real time, which can be integrated with cloud services.

== History ==
Founder Steve Newman had the idea for Scalyr while working at Google, drawing on his experience with performance-tracking and server diagnostic tools. He also founded Writely in 2005, which went on to become Google Docs.

After its start in 2011, Scalyr has resorted to venture capital to expand its operations. In 2015, the company raised a $2.1 million seed round led by Susa Ventures. The other investors in the round were Bloomberg Beta, Google Ventures, Sherpalo Ventures and Othman Laraki.

In 2019, Christine Heckart was announced as the new CEO.

=== Acquisition by SentinelOne ===
In February 2021, SentinelOne announced the acquisition of Scalyr for $155 million in cash and equity.
