= W3Perl =

- Original author: Laurent Domisse
- Stable release: 3.20 / 30 June 2015; 10 years ago
- Written in: Perl
- Operating system: Cross-platform
- Type: Web analytics
- License: GNU General Public License
- Website: www.w3perl.com

W3Perl is a free software logfile analyser, which can parse Web/FTP/Mail/CUPS/DHCP/SSH and Squid logfiles. Most major web logfile formats are supported (Web : CLF/ECLF/NECLF on Unix, IIS/W3C on Microsoft; Mail : Postfix/Sendmail/Exim), as well as split/compressed files. "Page tagging" and counter are also supported if you do not have logfiles access. The output is spread over HTML pages, with graphics and a sortable table. Stats can be run from a single command line or from a web browser.

== Features ==
Essential features like hosts, pages, scripts, countries, filetype, traffic, hourly, daily, weekly, monthly, referrer, user agent, and error are available along with other specific W3Perl stats like real-time and session stats.

== Administration ==
W3Perl has an administration interface which allows building configuration files from a web interface. One can also manage configuration files, package updates, run scripts, and see stats output.

== Cross-platform availability ==
Written in Perl, W3Perl can be installed on any operating system that supports Perl. As such, it can be installed on Unix, Windows or Mac OS X. An installer is available for Windows and Mac OS X.

== Licensing ==
W3Perl is licensed under the GNU GPL.

== Security considerations ==
Running the scripts from the administration interface should be restricted with login/password. Blocking referrer spam have been added but as it is based on a blacklist, the file must be updated regularly. Real-time stats can only run once to prevent overloading the server.

=== Alternatives ===
There are other free tools:

- Analog is written in C (and therefore very fast) but it lacks some features like session statistics.
- AWStats has a large user base, is very powerful but still lacks some of the features of W3Perl.
- Piwik is a set of scripts in PHP using a Mysql database.

== See also ==
- Data logging
- List of web analytics software
- Server log
- Web analytics
- Web log analysis software
