= Matomo (software) =

Open source software web analytics system

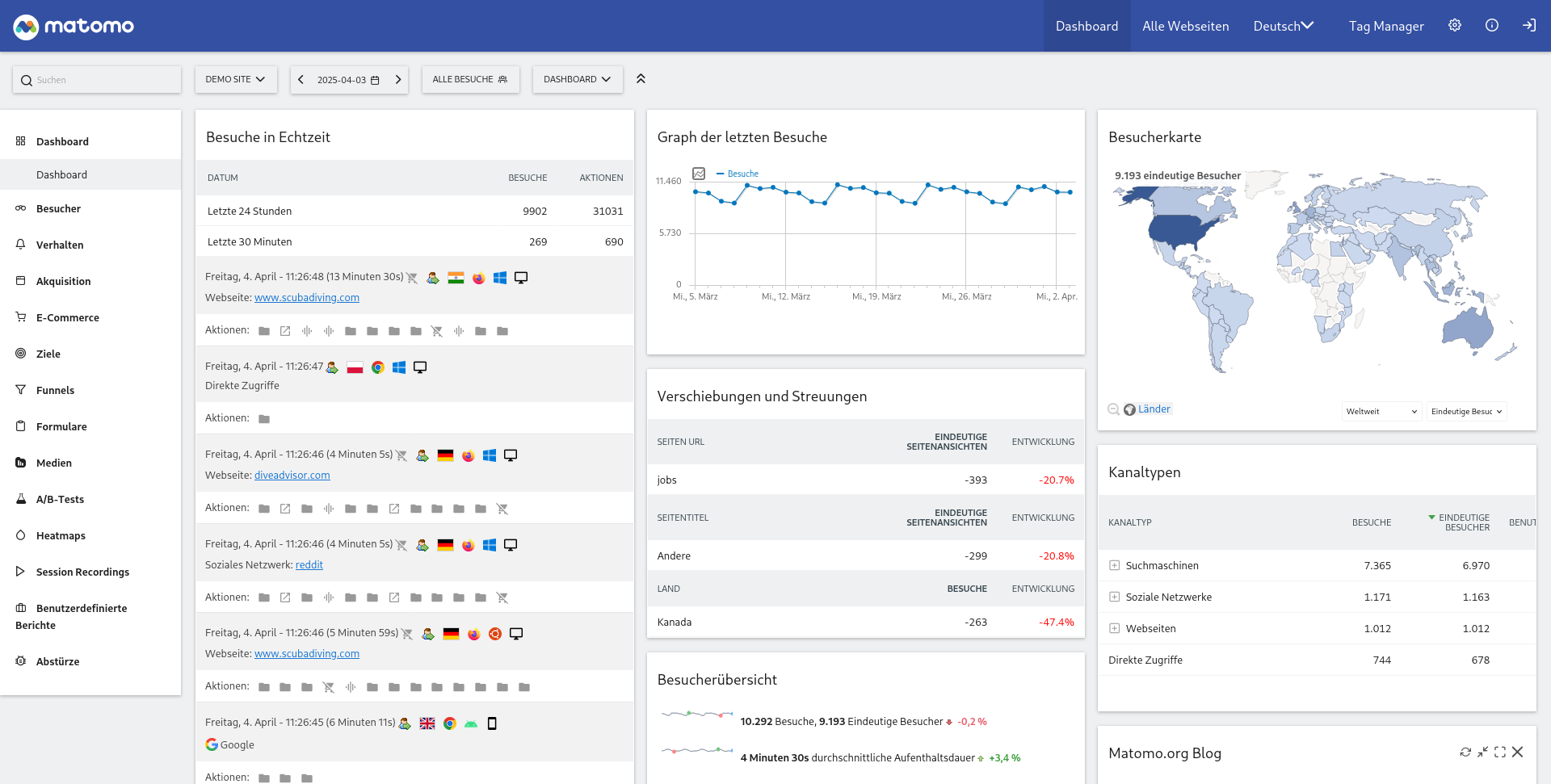
- Matomo dashboard
- Stable release: 5.14.2 / 22 October 2026; 26 days ago
- Operating system: Cross-platform
- Available in: PHP
- Type: Web analytics
- License: GNU GPL v3
- Website: matomo.org
- Repository: github.com/matomo-org/matomo

Matomo, formerly Piwik (pronounced /ˈpiːwiːk/), is a free and open source web analytics application to track online visits to one or more websites and display reports on these visits for analysis.

== Features ==
Matomo is developed by a team of international developers and runs on a PHP/MySQL webserver. It has been translated into 54 languages.

It offers features like:

- Web and mobile analytics
- A/B testing
- Custom reports
- Heatmaps and session recordings
- Funnels

== Usage ==
As of July 2022, Matomo was used by over a million websites, representing over 2% of all websites with known traffic analysis tools and 6% of all top 10k global websites. As of November 2026, W3Techs reported Matomo on 1.4% of all websites, or 2.4% of the websites whose traffic analysis tool it could identify.

It is recommended and used by various public administrations including CNIL, the European Commission and the Italian government.

== History ==
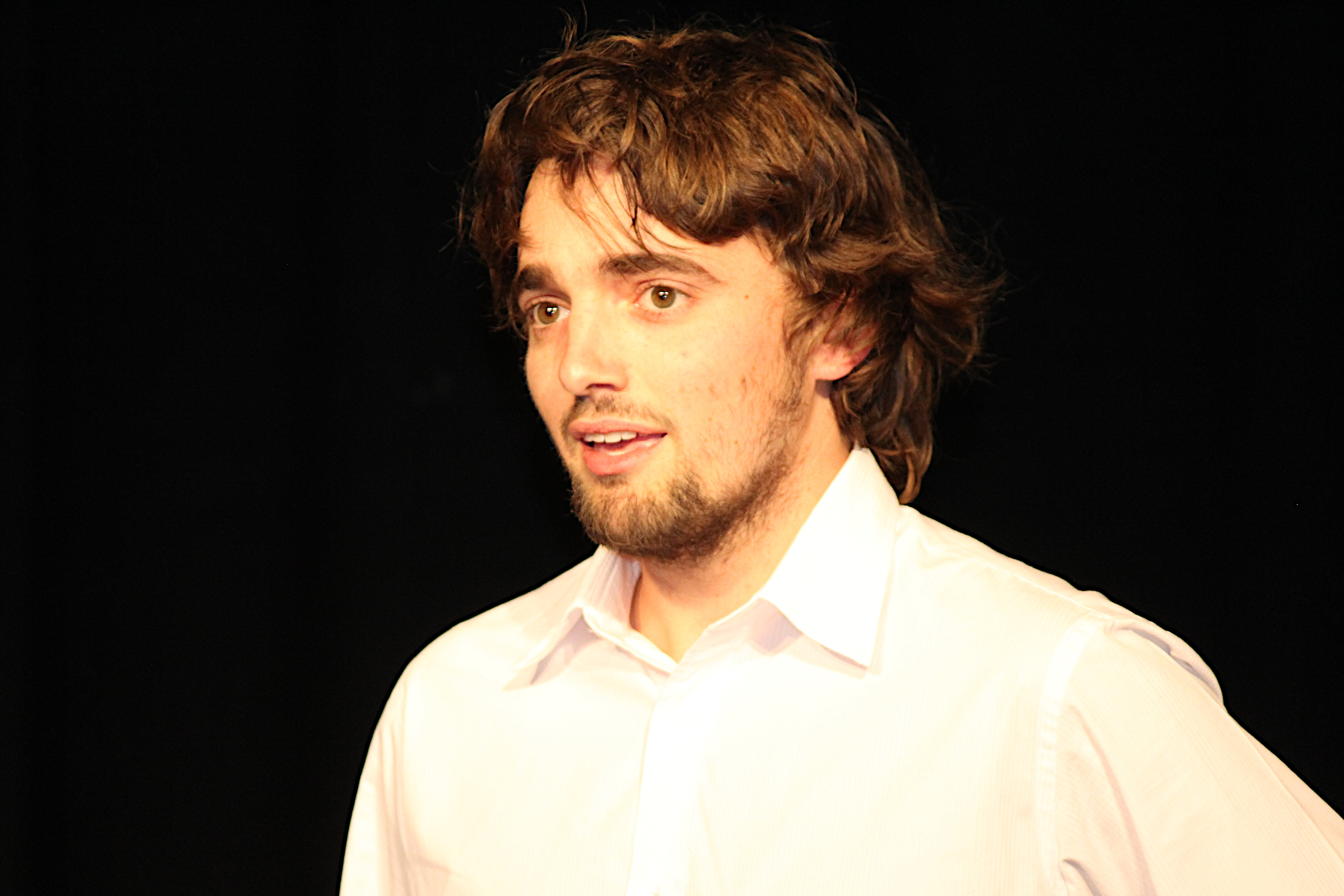
Matthieu Aubry receiving an award for Piwik at the 2012 New Zealand Open Source Awards

Piwik was released in late 2007 as a replacement for phpMyVisites, with full API support, a cleaner UI, modern graphs, better architecture and better performance.

On 21 November 2008, SourceForge announced the availability of Piwik as a hosted application for developers.

Piwik was selected SourceForge's Project of the Month for July 2009.

In August 2009, Piwik was named among the best of open source enterprise in InfoWorld's 2009 Bossie Awards.

In December 2012, Piwik started crowdfunding for requested new features.

In September 2013, Matthieu Aubry and Maciej Zawadziński, the CEO of Clearcode, founded Piwik PRO. It provided support and features for the open source Piwik. Clearcode bought out Matthieu Aubry in June 2016 to become the sole owner of Piwik PRO.

In January 2018, Piwik was officially renamed as Matomo.

In late 2019, Matomo released a WordPress plugin called Matomo Analytics, which allowed WordPress users to host the open source analytics platform directly in their WordPress installation. With MatomoCamp 2021 the first Matomo conference took place.

== See also ==
- AWStats
- Open Web Analytics
- List of web analytics software
