= AT Internet =

AT Internet LTD
- Company type: Private
- Industry: Digital Analytics; Analytics Consulting
- Founded: 1995
- Founder: Alain Llorens
- Headquarters: Bordeaux, France
- Key people: Mathieu Llorens (CEO); Jean-Baptiste Roux (VP Sales); Vincent Lataste (CTO); Cyril Mazeau (CFO)
- Products: Analytics Suite
- Number of employees: 220 (2017)
- Website: www.atinternet.com

AT Internet is a privately held company that provides web analytics services and consulting for websites, intranet, mobile sites and mobile applications. It has provided these services since 1995. The company is commonly known (especially in France) by the former name of its flagship product XiTi. AT Internet's application, the Analytics Suite, is used on approximately 20,000 websites and mobile applications worldwide.

== History ==
The company was founded in 1995 by owner Alain Llorens as a web agency. The group's focus shifted to web analytics in 1997.

In 2015, AT Internet launched the Analytics Suite, an integrated suite of applications for analytics reporting, dashboard creation, data visualization, data mining, app analytics and data export.

In 2016, the company raised a total of €4 million in funding for R&D and recruiting from Bpifrance, CIC, COFACE, the European Regional Development Fund, and the Nouvelle-Aquitaine region (after having raised €6.5 million in 2013).

In 2021, AT Internet was acquired by Piano Software Inc. for an undisclosed amount.

== Products and services ==
AT Internet provides tools enabling companies and organizations to measure and analyse how visitors arrive on their website (mobile site, or mobile application), as well as their subsequent actions and behaviors on the site. This information can be visualized in dashboards and reports, which can then be shared across the organization.

AT Internet's software can be integrated with approximately 30 digital marketing applications.

The company offers specialized consulting services, both on-site and remote.

== Certifications and privacy ==
France's data protection authority, the CNIL, has recognized AT Internet's Analytics Suite for its full compliance with French cookie regulations. Its audience measurement application has been granted exemption by the CNIL from obtaining cookie consent.

The Analytics Suite is certified by independent measurement organizations worldwide including the UK's ABC, KIA-Index, TÜV Saarland, OJD Espana, and France's ACPM. According to the company, its software complies with the requirements of the European Commission's General Data Protection Regulation, and all data is processed in Europe and stored on proprietary servers in France.
