= Webtrends =

Web analytics company based in Portland, Oregon

- Type: Private
- Industry: Web Analytics, Digital Marketing
- Founded: 1993
- Headquarters: Portland, Oregon, U.S.
- Key people: Joe Davis, CEO
- Products: Analytics, Testing, Targeting, Search and Social Marketing, Remarketing, Streaming Data Delivery, Audience Segmentation
- Website: https://www.webtrends.com/

Webtrends is a private company headquartered in Portland, Oregon, United States, that provides digital analytics, optimization, and software solutions related to digital marketing and e-commerce.

== History ==
W. Glen Boyd and Eli Shapira founded the company in 1993 as "E.G. Software".

NetIQ acquired the company in 2001. In 2002, NetIQ released version 5.0 of Webtrends Reporting Center and in 2005, NetIQ sold Webtrends to the private equity fund Francisco Partners.

On October 31, 2007, three corporate vice presidents and the CEO were asked to resign from the company. Initial speculation suggested the company might be sold to its largest competitor, but later reports indicated that the change signaled a long-term strategic shift.

In February 2014, the company hired Joe Davis as its new CEO. In May 2014, the company moved its headquarters from the Pacific First Center to the U.S. Bancorp Tower in Downtown Portland.

=== Impact ===
In 2009, Webtrends launched a transit ad campaign that posed the question of implementing a cyclist road tax. The campaign aimed to demonstrate the company's ability to use web analytics to track online commentary about the issue.

=== Acquisitions ===
Webtrends acquired ClickShift, an automated optimization product in online advertising, in December 2006. ClickShift's technology was integrated into Webtrends' Marketing Lab suite, which includes its analytics and marketing warehouse products, and rebranded as Webtrends Dynamic Search. In August 2008, the product was relaunched as Webtrends Ad Director.

Webtrends acquired Seattle-based Widemile, a provider of multivariate testing and targeting, on July 30, 2009. The product was rebranded and relaunched as Webtrends Optimize the day the acquisition was made public.

Webtrends acquired San Francisco-based Transpond, a maker of social microsites and applications that can be distributed over the web or Facebook, on August 10, 2010. The product was rebranded as Webtrends Apps at the time of the announcement and was later rebranded as Webtrends Social.

Webtrends acquired Reinvigorate from Culver City, CA-based Media Temple Ventures. Reinvigorate developed a real-time analytics web product using visit heat mapping technologies. The product was rebranded as Webtrends Reinvigorate and later discontinued.

== Products ==
Webtrends offers a variety of web analytics products and services that focus on the collection and presentation of user behavior data for websites and mobile device applications.

The New York Times has described the company's offerings as "products that analyze spending by Web site visitors."

The core product, Webtrends Analytics, is available in both software and software as a service (SaaS) models. Over the years, Webtrends has released a number of SaaS products, including Webtrends Segments, Webtrends Optimize, Action Center, Webtrends Streams and Webtrends Ads.

A 2012 "integration" deal linked WebTrends and Hootsuite.

Their Email remarketing tool, released in 2013, helps online marketers leverage real-time data on abandoned virtual shopping carts.

In February 2015, Webtrends completed the worldwide rollout of Webtrends Explore, their ad-hoc analytics application.

In 2016, Webtrends announced the release of a new analytics product, Webtrends Infinity Analytics; a year later, they sold it to Oracle.

On August 1, 2018, a management buyout led to the spin-off of their testing and personalization offering, Webtrends Optimize, into a standalone company. Headquartered in the UK, the new company was headed by Matthew Smith, the former Director of Optimisation Services, who assumed the role of CEO. Following the split, the Optimize product was rebranded and re-platformed and has been operating independently since then.

=== Data collection ===
Webtrends software uses log file analysis and page tagging. Log analysis reads the files in which the web server records all its transactions. In page tagging, parameter name-value pairs are appended (either automatically via a JavaScript 'tag' or manually through hand-coding) to the query string of a GIF image hosted on a data collection server. When a visitor loads the page in a browser, the browser sends a request to the data collection server so that it may load the GIF image. The data collection server receives the request and logs the parameters included in the query string of the GIF image.

The software analyzes and organizes the captured data into reports for each configured 'Profile'. Reports are viewable by various means, most commonly through a web-based graphic user interface or a scheduled emailed export of the report in PDF or CSV format. Collected data can also be viewed via raw log file delivery, REST and ODBC queries, and other products that use the Webtrends Data Extraction API. The web-based reporting interface is customizable, allowing administrators to specify which information is analyzed, how it is presented, and who can access it.
