= Sawmill (software) =

- Developer: Flowerfire Inc.
- Initial release: 1998
- Final release: 8.8.0 / 14 February 2019; 6 years ago
- Written in: C
- Operating system: Cross-platform
- Available in: Spanish
- Type: Web analytics, Log analysis
- Website: sawmill.net

Sawmill was a software package for the statistical analysis and reporting of log files. Sawmill also incorporated real-time reporting and alerting.

Sawmill supported approximately 850 server log file formats. It included a page-tagging server and a JavaScript page tag for analyzing client-side clicks (client requests), providing a view of visitor traffic and on-site activity.

Sawmill Analytics was offered in three forms: a software package for user deployment, a system appliance for use on-premises, and an application for software as a service (SaaS). Sawmill analyzed devices or software packages to produce a log file that included web servers, firewalls, proxy servers, mail servers, network devices, syslog servers, and databases.

Branded versions of Sawmill included Sawmill for IronPort by Cisco Systems, InterGate Intelligence by Vicomsoft Ltd, and SonicWALL Aventail Advanced Reporting by SonicWALL.

Sawmill went out of business on 17 May 2021.

== See also ==
- Log analysis
- List of web analytics software
- Sawzall (programming language)
