= Abandonment rate =

Term in marketing on online shopping

In marketing, abandonment rate is a term associated with the use of virtual shopping carts. Also known as "shopping cart abandonment". Although shoppers in brick and mortar stores rarely abandon their carts, abandonment of virtual shopping carts is quite common. Marketers can count how many of the shopping carts used in a specified period result in completed sales versus how many are abandoned. The abandonment rate is the ratio of the number of abandoned shopping carts to the number of initiated transactions or to the number of completed transactions.

Around 10 sources of information are used before making a decision when buying online (e.g. webshops, review websites, social networks, and the like). In this process the shopper compares at least 5 different websites for the product, and spends up to 20 hours researching. This means that shopping online is not as easy as some predicted 20 years ago.

From both business and scientific perspectives, researchers and practitioners have investigated the problem of online shopping abandonment, trying to understand and address the causes of such low conversion rates. They mostly agree that the biggest problems, for online cart abandonment were: lack of transparency, unclear transaction and delivery costs, lack of trust in the online seller, and poor website functioning or complicated processes.

== Causes ==
There are various reasons behind a high cart abandonment rate. To understand them, one must examine the cart page, undertake qualitative research, and build a theory as to why this is occurring. In general, these reasons can be categorized as different risks that affect the user's decision to ultimately complete the purchase, such as:

- Complicated checkout process.
- Hidden prices that come out at the time of checkout like taxes or high shipping charge.
- Tough or lengthy registration process. No option to check out without signing up.
- Limited payment options.
- Decision to purchase from a land-based store (as opposed to online).
- Entertainment value (e.g. placing items for fun or because of boredom).
- Utilization as a research and organization tool.
- Desire to wait for a lower/sale price.
- Privacy/security concerns.
- Non-delivery fear (e.g. product is lost in delivery).
- Difference in product description versus actual product.
- Poor cart page design.
- High shipping cost.
- Long delivery times.
- Searching for coupon codes.

Another problem is that people have too many passwords. A MasterCard and University of Oxford study in 2017 showed about a third of purchases were not made because the person could not remember a password. One of the basic causes may also be customers using shopping carts to determine the total price, identify hidden costs, or to serve as an option to store wish lists.

== Implications ==
As a result, there are some implications that can be applied to online retails.

- Organizational use of cart
  - Users often abandon their cart not because of dissatisfaction but as an organizational method. Even abandoned carts serve as a source of useful information for both consumers and retailers. Retailers can collect information on shoppers interests and use that to better present purchases and improve throughput in the future.
- Entertainment Value
  - Consumers who use carts for fun or to alleviate boredom may still spread positive words about the online retailer and their experience, despite not completing the purchase.
- Concerns about price and overall cost
  - Concerns about cost may not necessarily equate a lost sale, but rather an opportunity to make the sale in the future by offering a discount reminder whenever possible. A flat shipping rate may also positively influence the throughput versus a variable rate. Users will be more inclined to purchase more in one sitting as they no longer fear the need to pay excessive shipping.

== Purpose ==
Abandonment rate is a marketing metric which helps marketers to understand website user behavior. Specifically, abandonment rate is defined as "the percentage of shopping carts that are abandoned" prior to the completion of the purchase. This information is generally not used on a facility reservation report. It's vital to note that abandonment rates differ extensively each site. It's tough to set market norms for them. Each site, with its own consumer base and target audience, will necessitate its own assessment and solutions.

The typical shopping cart abandonment rate for online retailers varies between 60% and 80%, with an average of 71.4%. It is claimed that the best optimized checkout process has an abandonment rate of 20%. To achieve such optimization, websites use tools such as shopping cart recovery service or adopt strategies that are developed to improve conversion rates. This is demonstrated by the so-called conversion rate optimization approach, which persuades visitors to purchase through persuasive copywriting, credibility-based web design, and value propositions such as an offer to donate or commit to some positive future action.

But why does (cart) abandonment rate matter? In fact, two visitor segments relate to cart abandonment rates: Website visitors with a modest level of interest and visitors with a strong desire to learn more about the website. Visitors who have a moderate level of interest add products to their cart but never look at the cart page are those who have a moderate level of interest. Visitors who have a high level of interest in the site, on the other hand, add things to the cart page, browse to the basket, but never complete the checkout process, are considered high-interest visitors. Both visitor segments are viable conversion candidates on the website, though at varying levels of commitment. Choose one of the two cart abandonment definitions for your website and use it consistently.

== Calculating Cart Abandonment Rates ==
It is not necessary to do complex mathematical equations to calculate cart abandonment rate, it is simply the percentage of carts that do not convert to a sale. The calculation is, therefore to divide the number of completed purchases by the number of opened shopping carts.

Cart Conversion Rate = ( Number of Completed Purchases / Number of Shopping Carts Opened) X 100

For example; Let's say you have a grocery store. This market recorded 200 completed purchases and opened 1600 shopping carts. These numbers indicate that the market has 12.5% complete transactions. Cart abandonment rate: 1- cart conversion rate. This equates to 1–12.5%=87.5%.

Cart Abandonment Rate = 1 - Cart Conversion Rate

As an example, an online comics retailer found that of the 25,000 customers who loaded items into their electronic baskets, only 5,000 actually purchased:

- Purchases not completed = purchases initiated less purchases completed = 25,000 − 5,000 = 20,000.
- Abandonment rate = Not completed / Customer Initiation = 20,000 / 25,000 = 80% abandonment rate.

== See also ==
- Email remarketing
- SaleCycle
