= IBM Unica NetInsight =

- Developer: IBM
- Initial release: 1996; 29 years ago
- Final release: 8.6.x / June 2012; 13 years ago
- Written in: C, HTML, CSS and JavaScript
- Operating system: Cross-platform
- Available in: English, Spanish, French, German and Italian
- Type: Web analytics
- License: proprietary
- Website: www.ibm.com/software/marketing-solutions/index.html

IBM Unica NetInsight was a web analytics application that utilized an Extract, transform, load methodology to populate a database that could then be queried using a browser-based interface. NetInsight is from the same family of tools as Unica NetTracker. In April 2014, IBM announced Unica NetInsight would be discontinued.

== History ==
Affinium NetInsight was first released in June 2006 at version 7.0. With the release of version 8.0 Affinium NetInsight has been renamed to Unica NetInsight, dropping (along with the rest of the Unica products) the Affinium brand.

IBM acquires Unica Corporation and the Unica NetInsight software adopts the IBM name, IBM Unica NetInsight.

== Technology ==
The NetInsight Extract, transform, load process can read log files in virtually any format, including logs from web servers, proxy servers, streaming media servers and FTP servers. As well as processing normal server log files NetInsight can use log files derived from page tags to replace or augment log file data.

NetInsight stores its processed log files in a database such as Oracle database, Microsoft SQL Server, IBM DB2 or the Netezza appliance.

== See also ==
- Web analytics
- Web log analysis software
