= Woopra =

Customer analytics service

Woopra, Inc.
- Type: Web Services
- Industry: Technology
- Founded: 1 March 2008
- Founder: Elie Khoury, Jad Younan, John Pozadzides
- Headquarters: San Francisco, California, United States
- Key people: Elie Khoury, CEO; Jad Younan, CTO
- Products: Woopra Web Analytics
- Website: woopra.com

Woopra /ˈwuːprə/ is a customer analytics service intended to assist organizations with developing marketing techniques.

== History ==
Woopra was initially conceived by Elie Khoury and Jad Younan while in college. The pair, from Lebanon, wanted to introduce real time web analytics, at a time when this technology didn't exist. After development of an initial platform they approached US-based entrepreneur, blogger and CMO of managed infrastructure company Layered Tech, John Pozadzides. The three formed a partnership.

Pozadzides initially served as CEO and set up the company's legal framework. Khoury focused on UI and front end development, and Younan focused on infrastructure and back end development. The service was in stealth development mode during the 2008 financial crisis and Pozadzides provided the seed funding to keep the company going while also facilitating Khoury and Younan's immigration to the United States and raising additional funding from close contacts. Pozadzides' hosting company Layered Technologies also provided 100 VMs to help Woopra initially scale its service.

In March 2008 Pozadzides launched Woopra at WordCamp Dallas which kickstarted the growth of the service when the 200 bloggers in attendance were each given accounts and began a viral campaign that drove exponential growth.

The company was originally incorporated in Texas as iFusion Labs, LLC. but later moved to California with the relocation of Khoury and Younan to Silicon Valley in order to have access to a more targeted talent pool of developers.

Subsequently Pozadzides exited the company and Khoury assumed the CEO position. Woopra has since gone on to focus on enterprise clients.

== Press ==
In 2012, eWeek listed Woopra as a "hot web analytics" company and American Express OPEN Forum listed it as one of the "smartest web analytics tools". Business 2 Community, in 2012, cites Woopra's real time analytics as a useful adjunct to Google Analytics.

== See also ==
- List of web analytics software
