= GoAccess =

Open-source web analytics application for Unix-like operating systems

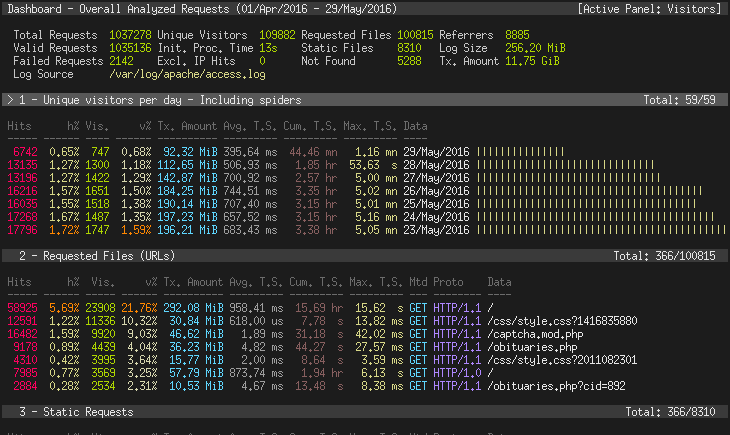
- GoAccess in terminal
- Developer(s): Gerardo O.
- Initial release: July 5, 2010; 14 years ago
- Stable release: 1.9.3 / 1 June 2024; 9 months ago
- Repository: github.com/allinurl/goaccess
- Operating system: Linux, FreeBSD, OpenBSD, NetBSD, macOS
- Available in: C
- Type: Web analytics
- License: MIT
- Website: goaccess.io

GoAccess is an open-source web analytics application for Unix-like operating systems.

The application has both a text-based and a web application user interface.

GoAccess can provide real-time analytics by continuously monitoring web server logs.

== See also ==
- List of web analytics software
