= Unica Corporation =

Massachusetts marketing automation software company, acquired by IBM in 2010

HCL Unica
- Type: HCLSoftware, a division of HCLTech
- Industry: Marketing Automation
- Founded: 1992 by Yuchun Lee, Ruby Kennedy and David Cheung
- Headquarters: Noida, India
- Key people: C Vijayakumar, (CEO & Managing Director of HCL Technologies); Rajiv Shesh, (CRO HCLSoftware); Kalyan Kumar, (CPO HCLSoftware); Yuchun Lee, (Founder)
- Products: HCL Unica Journey, HCL Unica Deliver, HCL Unica Campaign, HCL Unica Interact, HCL Unica Plan MRM
- Website: https://www.hcl-software.com/unica

Unica is a brand within HCLSoftware, a part of HCL Technologies comprising multiple Enterprise Marketing Management components. It was formerly a brand within IBM. HCL acquired Unica as a part of $1.8 billion purchase of select IBM products.

When purchased by IBM, Unica was managed by Yuchun Lee and had around 500 employees.

== History ==
Unica was founded in 1992 by Yuchun Lee, Ruby Kennedy and David Cheung. The company is headquartered in Waltham, Massachusetts, with additional offices in the US, Australia, France, Germany, India, Netherlands, Singapore, Spain, and the UK. They primarily serve the financial services, insurance and healthcare, business-to-business services, retail, automotive, technology, telecommunications, travel and hospitality, media and publishing, energy, and pharmaceutical markets.

In August 2010, IBM announced its intent to acquire Unica for $480M. The acquisition was complete in October 2010. Post acquisition, the Unica portfolio was focused on Unica Campaign, Unica Campaign Optimization, Unica Marketing Operations, and Unica Interact. The Unica suite also retains Detect and Distributed Marketing for legacy customers.

In December 2018, HCL Technologies announced its intent to acquire Unica including other IBM products such as, Appscan for secure application development, BigFix for secure device management, Portal for digital experience, Notes & Domino for email and low-code rapid application development, Commerce for omni-channel eCommerce, and Connections for workstream collaboration. HCL Technologies had been engaged with IBM in an intellectual property partnership where HCL provided services, support, and development previously for some of these. In July 2019, HCL Technologies completed the acquisition of Unica and other noted products and subsequently formed a completely new division named HCL Software to manage the new software portfolio.

HCL Software has invested heavily in the Unica platform since 2019 with one major release and several minor releases per year. To date, HCL Software has released a V11.0, V11.1, V12.0, and V12.1. In the first year, Unica added over 2000 enhancements. With the July 2020 release, Unica added three new products; Deliver, Journey, and Link, which was the largest expansion of the Unica platform in over 20 years. In addition, Unica will now be licensed as a wholistic platform instead of the individual product modules.

== NetTracker ==
Unica NetTracker was a web analytics application that processed web log files. Unica NetTracker was first released in 1996 by Sane Solutions which was sold to Unica Corporation. NetTracker processes log files in virtually any format using a custom log definition. Logs can be processed from web servers, proxy servers, streaming media servers and FTP servers. As well as processing log files NetTracker can use page tag data to augment log file data. NetTracker stores its processed log files in an internal database which is based upon SQLite.

The version as of December 2006 was 7.1.0. Unica announced end-of-life and end-of-support on December 31, 2011, being succeeded by IBM Unica NetInsight.

== See also ==
- Web analytics
- Web log analysis software
