= Affinium =

Affinium may refer to:

- Affinium Pharmaceuticals, a Toronto, Canada, based biotechnology company, founded by Aled Edwards and John Mendlein
- The Affinium marketing software suite produced by Unica Corporation
