= Yandex.Metrica =

Web analytics service from Yandex

Yandex Metrica
- Website type: Web analytics
- Owner: Yandex
- Website: metrica.yandex.com
- Commercial: no
- Registration: Required
- Launched: 2008; 18 years ago
- Current status: Active

Yandex Metrica (Russian: Яндекс Метрика tr. Yandeks Metrika; stylised as Yandex.Metrica) is a free web analytics service offered by Yandex that tracks and reports website traffic. Yandex launched the service in 2008 and made it public in 2009.

As of 2019, Yandex.Metrica is the third most widely used web analytics service on the web.

== Features ==
Yandex.Metrica uses a simple JavaScript tag that a webmaster implements on their website. The tag collects audience, traffic, and behaviour data for the website. Metrica can be also linked with Yandex.Direct online advertising platform to collect ads conversion rate.

== See also ==
- Google Analytics
- List of web analytics software
