= Prompt Security =

- Company type: Private
- Industry: Cybersecurity
- Founded: August 2023
- Founder: Itamar Golan; Lior Drihem
- Headquarters: Tel Aviv, Israel
- Area served: Worldwide
- Key people: Itamar Golan (CEO; 2023–present); Lior Drihem (CTO; 2023–present); Vitaly Neyman (Chief Architect; 2024–present); Yoav Lasman (VP of R&D; 2025–present); Uri Golan (Head of Operations; 2023–present); Jeffrey Maier (VP of Revenue; 2024–present); Yael Macias (Head of Marketing; 2024–present); Benjamin Preminger (Head of Product; 2024–present)
- Number of employees: 50 (2025)
- Website: www.prompt.security

Prompt Security is an Israeli cybersecurity company. The company developed an enterprise platform designed to secure employee use of AI and protect in‑house AI applications by providing real‑time visibility, policy enforcement, and automated risk mitigation for GPT‑style systems and other generative AI deployments.

== History ==
Prompt Security was founded by Itamar Golan and Lior Drihem to address emerging security risks in applications that incorporate GPT‑like capabilities in Tel Aviv in August 2023. Before founding Prompt Security, Itamar Golan and Lior Drihem collaborated at Orca Security on the development of an initial generative AI feature within a security tool.

On 24 January 2024, Prompt Security emerged from stealth after completing a seed financing of US$5 million led by Hetz Ventures, with participation from Four Rivers and angel investors affiliated with the Cyberfuture global CISO investment alliance.

In 2024 the company won Check Point's CPX 2024 Innovation Sandbox and was named among Mako’s "21 Most Promising Startups in Israel" and Calcalist’s "Top 50 Most Promising Israeli Startups".

On 20 November 2024, Prompt Security announced a Series A financing of US$18 million led by Jump Capital, with participation from Hetz Ventures, Ridge Ventures, Okta Ventures, and F5.

On 5 August 2025, Prompt Security announced that it had entered into an agreement to be acquired by SentinelOne; the acquisition amount was not publicly disclosed.

In 2025, the company was included in industry lists such as CRN’s "10 Cybersecurity Startups To Watch", Calcalist’s "Top 50 Most Promising Israeli Startups", and Fortune & Evolution Equity Partners’ "Top 50 Cybersecurity Companies".

In May 2025, SentinelOne signed an agreement to acquire Prompt Security for $300 million.

== Activities ==
Prompt Security developed an all‑in‑one enterprise platform to secure employee AI usage and protect homegrown AI applications. The company provided services internationally, with the United States, the United Kingdom, and Israel identified as the largest markets for its services.
