= Webtrekk =

German company

Webtrekk GmbH
- Type: GmbH
- Industry: software Development, Web analytics, Online advertising
- Founded: 2004
- Founder: Christian Sauer (Founder), Norman Wahnschaff (Chief Technology Officer, Co-Founder)
- Defunct: 5 June 2019
- Headquarters: Robert-Koch-Platz 4, 10115 Berlin, Germany
- Number of locations: Milan, Italy; Madrid Spain
- Area served: Worldwide
- Products: Webtrekk Analytics; Webtrekk Marketing; Webtrekk Data Streams; Consulting; Mapp Cloud
- Number of employees: 100+ (2019)
- Website: www.webtrekk.com

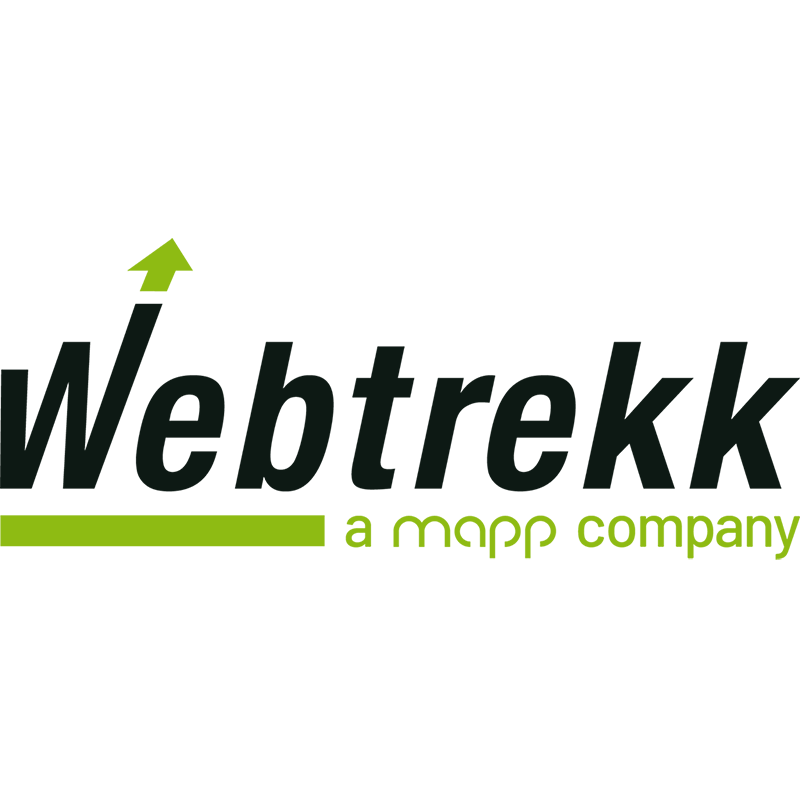
Company Logo

Webtrekk GmbH is a German company that offers marketing analytics and customer intelligence software. With Webtrekk, companies can connect, analyze and activate user and marketing data across all devices. Since 2019, Webtrekk is part of the marketing technology service provider, Mapp.

== History ==
Webtrekk was founded in 2004 by CEO Christian Sauer and CTO Norman Wahnschaff. In 2009, Webtrekk received a €1 million venture capital investment from Corporate Finance Partners as the winners of an Awin-sponsored Publisher Initiative Contest. In 2012, Webtrekk won the Frost & Sullivan Award for "Finally Bringing the ‘Real Time’ Into Online/Digital Analytics". In 2014, Webtrekk closed its third round of financing, collecting a total of up to €25 million from DPE Deutsche Private Equity. In 2018, Webtrekk won the bronze International Stevie Award in the category "Business or Competitive Intelligence“ for its cross device tracking tool, the Cross Device Bridge. In 2019, Webtrekk was honored with the German Stevie Award in Gold for its Realtime Predictions. In 2019, Webtrekk was acquired by the marketing technology service provider Mapp.

== Products and services ==
Webtrekk provides a variety of products to gain insights from data and trigger marketing activities. Products and services are cross-channel campaign reporting and AI-enabled marketing intelligence. The Webtrekk Customer Analytics suite includes user-centric analytics, personalized product recommendations, customer intelligence dashboards, customer journey tracking, tag integration, and web behavior re-targeting. The Webtrekk Data Streams enable raw data to be captured, processed and streamed in real time.

Since its acquisition, Webtrekk and Mapp consolidate their offerings. Webtrekk's customers also have access to Mapp's cross-channel marketing cloud.

Consulting and support are another part of Webtrekk's offering. A consulting unit works with customers on specific, large-scale projects, while a support team is available to answer questions about the functions and interface of Webtrekk products.

Access to raw, first-party data is a core component of Webtrekk's products. That data can be exported in real-time to data warehouses and BI systems or used to carry out in-depth analyses within the Customer Analytics suite. The suite's customizable dashboard engine enables customers to display, and can be connected to external data sources such as social media channels and CRM systems.

== Customers ==
Webtrekk has more than 400 customers, including FlixBus, ING, and MyToys. Focus industries are finance, publishing and e-commerce.

== Privacy certification ==
The products have been privacy certified by the German TÜV association to confirm Data Privacy and Security. All of Webtrekk's data servers are located in the European Union and housed in data centres that have been certified by the International Organization for Standardization.

== See also ==
- Customer journey
