= JICWEBS =

JICWEBS (the Joint Industry Committee for Web Standards) was created by the UK and Ireland media industry to ensure independence and comparability of measurement on the web. In effect JICWEBS works in partnership with the ABCe, with JICWEBS deciding whether metrics are desirable and ABCe deciding whether they are practical.

JICWEBS and TAG announced a formal partnership in March 2017. Since then, the two organizations have aligned their programs to strengthen standards, avoid duplicative effort, and extend their reach.

Web Metrics are intended to measure activity on web sites in a site centric fashion. These can include measurements of audience reach, frequency, and activity levels including the use and effectiveness of advertising on the web and other electronic media.

In 2020 JICWEBS announced that it was merging with the US based Trustworthy Accountability Group.

== See also ==
- Web analytics
