= Tealeaf =

Acoustic Experience Analytics (Tealeaf)
- Type: Privately held company
- Industry: Marketing Cloud software
- Founded: 1999
- Headquarters: New York City, New York, USA

Tealeaf was a company providing analytics software for web and mobile applications.

Tealeaf's products are used to provide visibility into the online customer experience by capturing, analyzing and replaying session details of customers' visits to find site errors or issues and understand the impact that transaction failures have on business processes. It is available in both software as a service (SaaS) and on-premises versions.

== History ==
Tealeaf was founded by Robert Wenig, Randi Barshack, and Igor Tsyganskiy in November 1999 as an independent spin-off of SAP AG. In developing web-based software for SAP, Wenig found it very difficult to reproduce problems reported by users. He came up with the idea that web sites could have a "black box" similar to an airplane cockpit voice recorder to understand what happened during any user visit. He developed software to record all the dynamically generated HTML at the network level and store it for later searching and visual replay. While the technology was originally created to assist software developers the technology has since been adapted for use by business users, call centers and legal compliance groups within organizations.

On May 1, 2012 Tealeaf signed an agreement to be acquired by IBM. Terms were not disclosed. The deal was closed on June 13 2012.

Tealeaf was a component of IBM's customer analytics portfolio, including heritage Coremetrics web analytics technologies. In late 2014 IBM introduced a SaaS-based version of Tealeaf (Tealeaf On Cloud) as a complement to its on-premises deployment model. In June 2016 IBM integrated the SaaS-based version of Tealeaf into its IBM Customer Experience Analytics offering, combining it with web analytics and multi-channel journey analytics.

In April 2019 IBM announced the sale of IBM marketing and commerce assets to Centerbridge Partners. This group of products included Tealeaf. By July 2019, Tealeaf and other former-IBM analytics were branded as "Acoustic" analytics.

== See also ==
- Online dispute resolution
- Web analytics
- Software performance testing
- Performance engineering
