= Plausible Analytics =

Open-source web analytics software

- Developer: Plausible Analytics
- Written in: Elixir
- Available in: English
- Type: Web analytics
- License: AGPLv3
- Website: plausible.io
- Repository: github.com/plausible/analytics

Plausible Analytics is an open-sourced web analytics software as a service (SaaS) platform, developed and hosted in the EU. It tracks visits to websites and shows website performance reports for their analysis and improvement of websites.

== Overview ==
Plausible Analytics was founded by Uku Täht in December 2018 and launched in 2019 by Uku Täht and Marko Saric. It is developed and maintained by a small, distributed team and funded through subscriptions to its SaaS version. The startup is self-funded and bootstrapped.

Plausible Analytics offers a cloud solution as well as the ability to self-host. It has been open-sourced. The platform is developed in the Elixir programming language. It is licensed under the GNU Affero General Public License v3 (AGPLv3).

Plausible Analytics is privacy-friendly and compliant with the General Data Protection Regulation (GDPR) and California Consumer Privacy Act (CCPA) and does not rely on cookies or persistent identifiers to track visitors.

== Reception ==
In October 2020, Plausible Analytics was judged to be the fastest-growing open-source startup by TechCrunch. In 2021, Plausible's WordPress plugin was noted as a simpler alternative to Google Analytics. The co-founder announced reaching $1 million in annual recurring revenue in June 2022. As of November 2026, Plausible tracked over 332 billion events across 9,142,026 websites.

Some notable customers include the Scottish government and The Steve Jobs Archive site.

== See also ==
- Web Analytics
- Privacy by design
- Open-source software
- List of Web Analytics software
