= Log monitor =

Type of software that monitors log files

Log monitors are a type of software that monitor log files. Servers, application, network and security devices generate log files. Errors, problems, and more information is constantly logged and saved for later log analysis.

In order to detect problems automatically, system administrators and operations set up monitors on the generated logs. The log monitors scan the log files and search for known text patterns and rules that indicate important events. Once an event is detected, the monitoring system will send an alert, either to a person or to another software/hardware system. Monitoring logs help to identify security events that occurred or might occur.
