= SaleCycle =

Behavioural marketing company, does software engineering

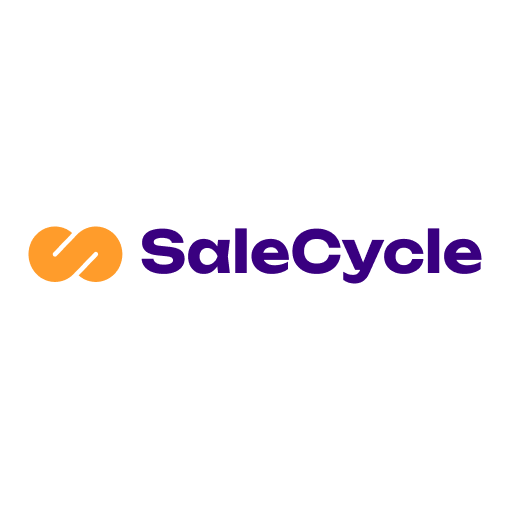
- Trade name: Salecycle Limited
- Company type: Private
- Industry: Behavioural Marketing; Software Engineering
- Founded: Houghton le Spring, UK (5 February 2010)
- Founder: Dominic Edmunds
- Website: salecycle.com

SaleCycle is a UK based global Behavioural Marketing firm. It works with online companies to reconnect with customers they've lost online, providing On-Site Remarketing and Email Remarketing solutions or application forms with dynamic and personalized messages in real-time.

SaleCycle also offers segmentation and customization of online shopping experiences for consumers. Key features of its services include real-time reporting and IT service management.

== Overview ==
The company was founded in 2010 and is headquartered in Houghton le Spring, UK. It has offices in Paris, Singapore, Brighton and New York, and its founder is CEO Dominic Edmunds.

Content strategy is one of their services.

== Activities ==
The firm's operations have enabled it to manage specific statistics regarding user behaviour through the online shopping process and it has released several market research studies, Infographics, eBooks, articles and educational webinars about eCommerce strategies.

The company was the first business-to-business (B2B) company to collect customer reviews through Reevoo SaleCycle received £11.5m in funding] for further expansion from BGF in June 2018.
