= Log management knowledge base =

The Log Management Knowledge Base is a free database of detailed descriptions on over 20,000 event logs generated by Windows systems, syslog devices and applications. Provided as a free service to the IT community by Prism Microsystems, the aim of the Knowledge Base is to help IT personnel make sense of the large amounts of cryptic and arcane log data generated by network systems and IT infrastructures.

Log data provides a record of all corporate system activity and is critical for improving security, complying with requirements such as Sarbanes-Oxley, HIPAA and PCI-DSS, and optimizing IT operations. However, given the large number of logs produced by different devices, their inherent obscurity and the lack of a standard logging format, system-specific expertise is typically needed to extract any meaningful intelligence.

The Knowledge Base provides this expertise free of charge via a searchable web repository with the aim of making log data readily understandable by all. The Knowledge Base can be searched using any combination of event log ID, source or fragments of the description field. Advanced search options are available as well

== See also ==
- System administration
- Log management and intelligence
