= Marfeel =

- Type: LLC
- Traded as: Marfeel Solutions S.L.
- Industry: Web Analytics; Data Analytics; User personalization
- Founded: Barcelona (2011)
- Founders: Juan Margenat; Xavi Beumala
- Headquarters: Barcelona, Spain; New York City, United States
- Area served: Worldwide
- Number of employees: 100–200
- Website: marfeel.com

Marfeel is a Barcelona-based software company providing analytics and content intelligence tools founded on October 6, 2011 by Xavi Beumala and Juan Margenat. Originally developed as a mobile-first publishing and monetization platform, the company shifted to focus on content analytics and audience intelligence.

== Platform ==
Marfeel is a software platform that provides digital publishers with tools for content analytics, AI-based editorial workflow automation, content distribution, and audience engagement features.

== History ==
Marfeel was established in 2011 in Barcelona by Xavi Beumala, and Juan Margenat; Beumala was an Adobe employee, while Margenat was a civil engineer and entrepreneur in Barcelona. Shortly after its establishment, Marfeel participated in The TechCrunch Barcelona Meetup, where it won the competition. Prior to requesting its first funding, the company was accepted in two startup accelerators: Wayra, Telefónica's's accelerator and SeedRocket. The company's concept originated from Beumala's observation that many websites offered inefficient mobile versions of their desktop counterparts.

Marfeel raised $2 million in 2013, in a Series A round. The round was led by Nauta Capital, with Elaia Partners, BDMI, and Wayra also investing. After announcing a 300% growth in 2015, Marfeel was listed in The Next Web's European Tech5 in March 2015. In January 2015, Marfeel became a certified Google partner, becoming Spain's first Google recommended mobile vendor. The company initiated a Series B funding round in late 2015, receiving a sum of $3.5 million. Marfeel aimed at using the funding to open an office in New York, expand its business the United States, and improve its technology.

In April 2016, TechCrunch announced Marfeel's full support for Facebook's newly-launched Instant Articles, providing a mobile publishing format that enables news publishers to distribute articles to Facebook's app.

During the COVID-19 pandemic, the company undertook a strategic repositioning, shifting its focus from mobile publishing and advertising technology toward content analytics and publishing intelligence for digital media organizations. This transition marked a significant change in the company's product direction, moving from a platform primarily serving mobile monetization needs to one providing data analytics and editorial decision-support tools for newsrooms.
