= Audit Bureau of Circulations (UK) =

British non-profit organisation

- Founded: 14 October 1931
- Founder: ISBA (Society of British Advertisers)
- Purpose: Newspaper and magazine circulation
- Website: abc.org.uk

The Audit Bureau of Circulations (ABC) is a non-profit organisation owned and developed by the media industry. ABC delivers industry-agreed standards for media brand measurement of print publications, digital channels and events. The company also verifies data, processes and good practice to these and other industry-agreed standards (such as those set by JICWEBS).

Established in 1931 by the Society of British Advertisers (an organisation which later became Incorporated Society of British Advertisers), ABC is a founder member of the International Federation of ABCs and was the first UK Joint Industry Currency (JIC) for the media industry. JICs are owned by the industry to provide transparent and independent audience measurement for each medium.

In May 2020, the board of the ABC voted to allow national newspaper publishers the option to 'opt out' of reporting their circulation figures publicly.

== Board ==
ABC is governed by a board consisting of advertisers, media agencies, media owners and trade bodies. They represent the differing interests of the media industry, agree new standards and make strategic decisions as to how ABC is run.

== Reporting Standards Group ==
ABC has Reporting Standards Groups (RSGs) responsible for setting reporting standards for media products across each of the following sectors: national, regional, consumer, business, bulk distribution and Republic of Ireland.

RSGs include representatives from media owners, media buyers and trade associations and typically meet three times a year. Changes to the Reporting Standards are generally agreed by consensus.

== Chairman ==
Andrew Hirsch became chair of the Organization in August 2025. He replaced Derek Morris who was announced as ABC UK's new chairman in October 2016 and took up the position in December of that year. He replaced Sally Cartwright who had chaired the board since 2010.

== Chief Executive ==
Simon Redlich has been the permanent CEO of ABC UK since 25 November 2016. He was previously announced as the interim CEO in January 2016, replacing Jerry Wright who stepped down from the role after more than seven years.

== Activities ==
Media brand measurement

As a JIC, ABC creates census based trading standards to accurately reflect media activity across print and digital platforms. It then provides independent verification of media owner data to these standards. This data and related information is shown on the media owner's ABC Certificate and can also be viewed and sorted using digital tables. All visitors to the ABC website can search for and download a current certificate. This transparency and availability of data helps to facilitate the buying and selling of advertising space.

Verification service

ABC is an independent verification provider for other media industry organisations including JICWEBS, the EDAA and Counter for example. ABC's role is to check that media companies are meeting the standards set by these other organisations.

Reporting

ABC publishes a range of data reports across a number of industry sectors.
