= Piano Media =

Largest provider of metered paywalls worldwide

- Company type: Private
- Industry: Internet
- Website: https://piano.io/

Piano Media, now Piano, is a SaaS software company specialising in media business content monetisation, including digital subscriptions (aka paywalls), marketing automation and personalisation for publishers across print, online and broadcast media. The company was founded in 2010 by Tomas Bella the Editor-in-Chief of Slovak daily newspaper SME. Piano Media foresaw the decline in digital revenues derived from banner ads and wanted to provide publishers with another revenue stream. As paid content was not common in 2010, Piano's product was a national paywall that allowed users to access multiple online media websites with a single digital subscription. Piano launched its first national paywall in 2011 in Slovakia and later in Slovenia. The company closed a €2 million funding round from 3TS Capital Partners in April 2012 to finance further expansion, including a national paywall in Poland in September 2012. In 2013, while operating three national paywalls in Central Europe, Piano attempted to expand the national paywall concept unsuccessfully into Western Europe. Eventually the business model evolved into selling its digital subscription software on a publisher-by-publisher basis. One of the first West European customers was German publisher M. DuMont Shauberg. In 2014, Piano Media entered the U.S. digital subscription market by acquiring US-based Press+ from RR Donnelley & Sons. The acquisition of Press+ made Piano Media the largest provider of metered paywalls worldwide with more than 1200 news and media providers globally using their platform. In August 2015 the company merged with another US-based paywall provider, Tinypass and rebranded as Piano.

== Piano Media rebrands as Piano ==
With the August 2015 merger of Piano Media with Tinypass, Piano's clients migrated to the Tinypass software platform called VX, a stand-alone turnkey paywall solution used by CNBC and NBC Sports. Piano's European customer M. DuMont Schauberg and Canada's Postmedia Network were the first customers to migrate to VX. The VX digital subscription software included a completely new product called Piano Composer that allowed publishers to monetise various user segments by building user journeys through a unique drag and drop interface. Over the next ten years, Piano became the most advanced, widely used paywall software licensed by publishers, broadcasters and digital media globally. It allowed publishers to monetise their content by collecting user data during a period of rapidly declining online advertising revenue due to a shift in online content consumption patterns, including the shift from reading on desktops to mobile phones, the installation of ad blockers and the massive shift to consuming content on social media, rather than directly on a publisher's websites.

As of March 2012, media earn monthly in average 1.1 eurocent per visitor.

== Funding history of Piano Media digital subscription software ==
In September 2011 Piano received Series-A funding from Jan Jenča and Ivan Štefunko at Monogram Ventures. Piano used the money to solidify their Slovak market share and expand their national paywall into several other Central European countries. In January 2012 Piano Media expanded into Slovenia, bringing seven publishers into the common payment system. In April 2012 Piano secured €2 million in a Series B growth capital round from 3TS Capital Partners’ Technology in Central and Eastern Europe Fund S.C.A. SICAR. The funding allowed Piano to accelerate their growth worldwide, by expanding its national paywall into Poland in September 2012. In 2013, the company pivoted away from national paywalls and focused on selling its digital subscription software to publishers Western Europe, the U.S. and Latin America.

== Criticism ==
Piano has been criticized for manipulated numbers claimed during paidContent conference. Its CEO Tomáš Bella expressed hope that 1% of the Slovakian internet population would become paid subscribers. Piano estimated in 2011 the Slovakian internet population to be 2.3 million people, but Eurostat 2011 and AIMmonitor (a service of IAB Slovakia) estimate 3.3 and 2.8 million people respectively, many of them dissatisfied with the customer service provided.

In May 2014, Piano released subscriber and revenue details from the first three years of Slovak activity to refute claims by blogger Rastislav Kuciak, that according to public accounts summary, Piano has 3,800 to 5,400 subscribers, far less than the official estimate of 20,000 subscribers. Piano's CEO Bella objected, stating that Piano has more subscribers than estimated by bloggers, but did not supply additional details.

According to Matus Kostolny, only unique content is locked and the rest is free, which enables newspapers to keep traffic on the website. SME.sk also restricted comments under articles to 3 comments per user and day for readers without Piano. A similar restriction was introduced in Pravda, but was later lifted.
