= CleverTap =

American customer engagement plaform

- Type: Private
- Industry: SaaS; Customer lifecycle management
- Founded: May 2013
- Founders: Sunil Thomas; Suresh Kondamudi; Anand Jain
- Headquarters: San Francisco, California, United States
- Area served: Worldwide
- Products: Customer engagement and retention platform
- Website: clevertap.com

CleverTap is an American customer engagement and retention platform. Its platform allows B2C brands to send contextual and personalised messages to their customers. It was established in 2013 in San Francisco, California.

== History ==
CleverTap was founded as WizRocket in May 2013 by former Network18 colleagues Sunil Thomas, Suresh Kondamudi, and Anand Jain. Its flagship product was privately launched in September 2015, followed by a public launch 3 months later. At the same time, the company renamed itself from WizRocket to CleverTap.

In December 2021, former Freshworks chief revenue officer Sidharth Malik was appointed as Clevertap’s global CEO. Malik stepped down in July 2024 and co-founder Sunil Thomas took over and is currently the CEO and executive chairman.

== Acquisitions ==
In 2021, CleverTap acquired Patch, a mobile tech startup.

In 2022, CleverTap acquired Leanplum, a mobile marketing vendor originating from Bulgaria and based in San Francisco. While the price of the acquisition was not disclosed, the company stated the funds were cash and stock transactions. With the acquisition, Clevertap’s customer base increased to 1,200. In 2025, 60-70 employees from Leanplum were laid off owing to integration challenges. A few more employees from CleverTap India were let go during the same time.

In 2025, it acquired rehook.ai, a loyalty program tech startup backed by Y Combinator, for an undisclosed amount.

== Funding ==
The company secured seed funding of USD$1.9 million from Accel in July 2014. Additional Series A funding of US$8 million was secured from Accel and Sequoia Capital in August 2015. In October 2017, the company secured an additional US$6 million from existing and new investors at RSP India Fund, an investment subsidiary of Recruit Holdings.

In April 2019, it raised US$26 million in Series B investment from Sequoia Capital, Tiger Global Management, and Accel.

In October 2019, CleverTap announced its Series C investment of US$35 million led by previous funders, bringing the total investment to just over US$77 million. It further raised $105 million in a Series D funding round, led by global investment firm CDPQ, IIFL AMC's Tech Fund, and existing investors Tiger Global and Sequoia India.

== Awards and recognition ==
In 2017, TiE Silicon Valley included CleverTap in its list of TiE50, World's 50 Most Promising Technology Startups. Sunil Thomas, CEO of the company, was named as one of the 25 Marketing Technology Trailblazers in 2017 by Advertising Age.

In 2021, CleverTap was recognized as one of Forbes’ Best Startup Employers in America for the second consecutive year.

In 2026, the company was included as a Leader in Gartner's Magic Quadrant for Personalization Engines.

== See also ==
- Behavioral analytics
