= Open Web Analytics =

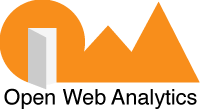
- Stable release: 1.8.1 / 7 September 2025; 8 months ago
- Operating system: Cross-platform
- Available in: PHP
- Type: Web analytics
- License: GPL (version 2)
- Website: www.openwebanalytics.com
- Repository: github.com/Open-Web-Analytics/

Open Web Analytics (OWA) is open-source web analytics software created by Peter Adams.

OWA is written in PHP and uses a MySQL database, which makes it compatible for running with an AMP solution stack on various web servers.

== Overview ==
OWA is comparable to Google Analytics, though OWA is server software anyone can install and run on their own host, while Google Analytics is a software service offered by Google.

OWA supports tracking with WordPress and MediaWiki, two popular website frameworks. This application helps webmasters keep track of and observe the influx of views on their websites.

The program also tracks the websites of competitors and their company's growth compared to the site in question.

== See also ==
- OpenSearchServer
