= Email remarketing =

Email remarketing comprises the email systems used by merchants to follow up with website visitors who do not make a desired purchase action. It is a development of email marketing that aims to re-attract website viewers or customers. In other words, the whole idea of email remarketing is attracting customers or users back for purchase, growing repeated customers.

== Types of email remarketing ==
Email remarketing can be done through various kinds of emails, such as:

=== Browse abandonment emails ===
Browse abandonment emails reconnect merchants with website visitors who quit the site without purchase action, giving chances to turn window shoppers into actual buyers. Browse abandonment is on the upper side of the purchase funnel, and the next abandonment which stop customers accessing to check-out is cart abandonment. Instead of contacting everyone, marketers are more likely to send email to the people who have shown obvious interest on the products. For example, they are the ones who browse key pages of the website or who begin a process such as registering an account or downloading a white paper but then stop the action, without purchase any products or services.

Usually, browse abandonment emails are edited based on the receivers' browse and search history. In this case, the emails would be personalized, more targeted on individuals, compared to marketing emails. Browse recovery emails could make approximately 36.63% revenue and rise 2.79% sales effectively.

=== Cart abandonment emails ===
As mentioned, cart abandonment is the second prevention. Cart abandonment emails are worked as a reminder of what items the receivers have abandoned. They are sent to customers who have added products to their shopping cart but failed to check-out. In order to prevent shopping cart abandonment, marketers would send remarketing email to customers.

Some people are worried that sending cart abandonment emails will annoy people, and while that make be the case, research shows that 69% of people found the 'reminders' to be helpful in some way.

Traditional cart abandonment emails require the advertiser to have contact information already in place to send the email. This requires that website visitors that abandon their carts must have previously subscribed, purchased, or otherwise provided their contact information. Newer technologies allow marketers to first identify anonymous website visitors using a cookie-based identification system, and then to follow-up with those visitors directly via email to convert them.

=== Retargeting anonymous website bounces ===
When individuals visit a website without converting there are tools available to identify anonymous website visitors, match them with their email address and follow-up directly to convert. Similar to cart abandonment, this type of email remarketing is done prior to the cart - with follow-up sent even if the visitor hasn't provided their contact information.

=== Post-purchase emails ===
After completing orders, merchants would send a review emails to consumers. Some of those emails are telling them what they have bought before, some are post-purchase survey, etc. Before consumers make purchase decisions, they are heavily rely on the customer reviews about the products. Here is an example. Sephora, a leading beauty retailer, thanks the customer for their recent purchase while simultaneously asking them to review their new products. Within the email they also give the shopper an additional reason to engage by promoting other content resources including Sephora TV and beauty news. This review campaign appears to be extremely successful. In addition, in the first quarter of 2015, the read rate for these campaigns was 58% higher than their average read rate and the deleted unread percentage was 44% lower. To sum up, post-purchase emails could not only help the companies to strength the brand identity, re-engage the existed customers, but also help attract new customers with advertisements and promotion.

Order follow ups, rewards or loyalty programs, inactive customer follow ups, and so forth...

== Comparison to email marketing ==
Email marketing is more similar to newsletter which is broad and impersonal, like sending a direct email to existing customers or potential customers. On this stage, marketers may have little information about the receivers. The purpose of Marketing email is solely to deliver promotional messages. Companies usually collect a list of customer or prospect email addresses to send direct promotional messages.

On the other hand, remarking emails should be much more personalized. As vendors probably have collected information about the customers on the first stage that the customers exposed, they are taking the information they already have and using them to send relevant emails. For instance, when a customer bought an item at his first visit, vendors would probably ask him to complete a form about his contact information. Afterwards, marketers would use those contact details to do their remarking campaigns. "Remarketing is so powerful because it allows marketers the opportunity to continue the conversation, that otherwise may have only been a 30-second decision on the part of the consumer," said Jason Hobbs, founder and president of digital marketing company The Found Group. Furthermore, Forrester Research found that remarketing emails can generate nearly four times more revenue and 18 times greater net profits compared with marketing using simply untargeted mailings.

Email marketing gives vendors a chance to promote their products at the beginning, but email remarking allows the company to continue the business but targeted at less customers. In conclusion, email marketing covers wider area of customer group, while email remarking methods are more targeted and effective.

== How email remarketing works ==
=== Benefits ===
The principle of advertisement is basically to give a persuasive argument for a product then put it in front of the public. With the development of technology, it makes advertising much easier. The word 'easier' means convenience and lower cost. In the past time, marketers usually printed the promotion messages into brochures then delivered them to thousands of mailboxes. Nowadays, marketers just design and edit the content into emails, then send those emails to countless email addresses in one second automatically. With no shipping fees, delay, and printing cost, companies definitely have decreased much of their advertising costs in the present decade. Lower cost leads to higher revenue sometimes. Moreover, the data displayed above proves that email remarketing is bringing vendors brand loyalty, financial return, and so on.

=== How it works ===
By definition of 'remarketing', it restricts the volume of customer group that the marketers could reach. However, instead of direct emails, email remarketing is reaching the customers whose purchase intent is highest. The remarketing email receivers are existed customers and potential customers who have shown attention and obvious interests on the products and services. In this case, a persuasive argument on the items could easily drive them to buy. When to send the remarketing emails is a substantial problem. Experian Marketing Services found that emails sent closer to the abandonment is more likely to make lifts in revenue. Generally, it can be as early as 30 minutes to 1 day. For the promotion and reactivation emails and the other emails, they are suggested to be sent at 2 p.m. on every Tuesday and Thursday.

What to send should be given careful consideration as well. For cart abandonment emails, the items left in the shopping cart should be shown in the email directly, as it leads to highest rate of transactions. The continue botton to check-out should be shown in the obvious position in the emails, as well as the option for the transaction tools, such as 'via PayPal' or 'Paid by MasterCard'. For the Thank You for Purchase email, it works better if it includes a discount information for the next purchase.

Frequency is the key. Experian Marketing Services recommends that cart abandonment emails should be sent at least twice after the first attempt, because the survey shows 54% lift in revenues when the second reminder email sent.
