= Web log analysis software =

Software for analyzing log files of web servers

Web log analysis software (also called a web log analyzer) is a kind of web analytics software that parses a server log file from a web server, and based on the values contained in the log file, derives indicators about when, how, and by whom a web server is visited. Reports are usually generated immediately, but data extracted from the log files can alternatively be stored in a database, allowing various reports to be generated on demand.

Features supported by log analysis packages may include "hit filters", which use pattern matching to examine selected log data.

== Common indicators ==
- Number of visits and number of unique visitors
- Visit duration and last visits
- Authenticated users, and last authenticated visits
- Days of week and rush hours
- Domains/countries of host's visitors.
- Hosts list
- Number of page views
- Most viewed, entry, and exit pages
- File types
- OS used
- Browsers used
- Robots used
- HTTP referrer
- Search engines, key phrases and keywords used to find the analyzed web site
- HTTP errors
- Some of the log analyzers also report on who is on the site, conversion tracking, visit time and page navigation.

== See also ==
- List of web analytics software
