= Red Hat Enterprise Linux derivatives =

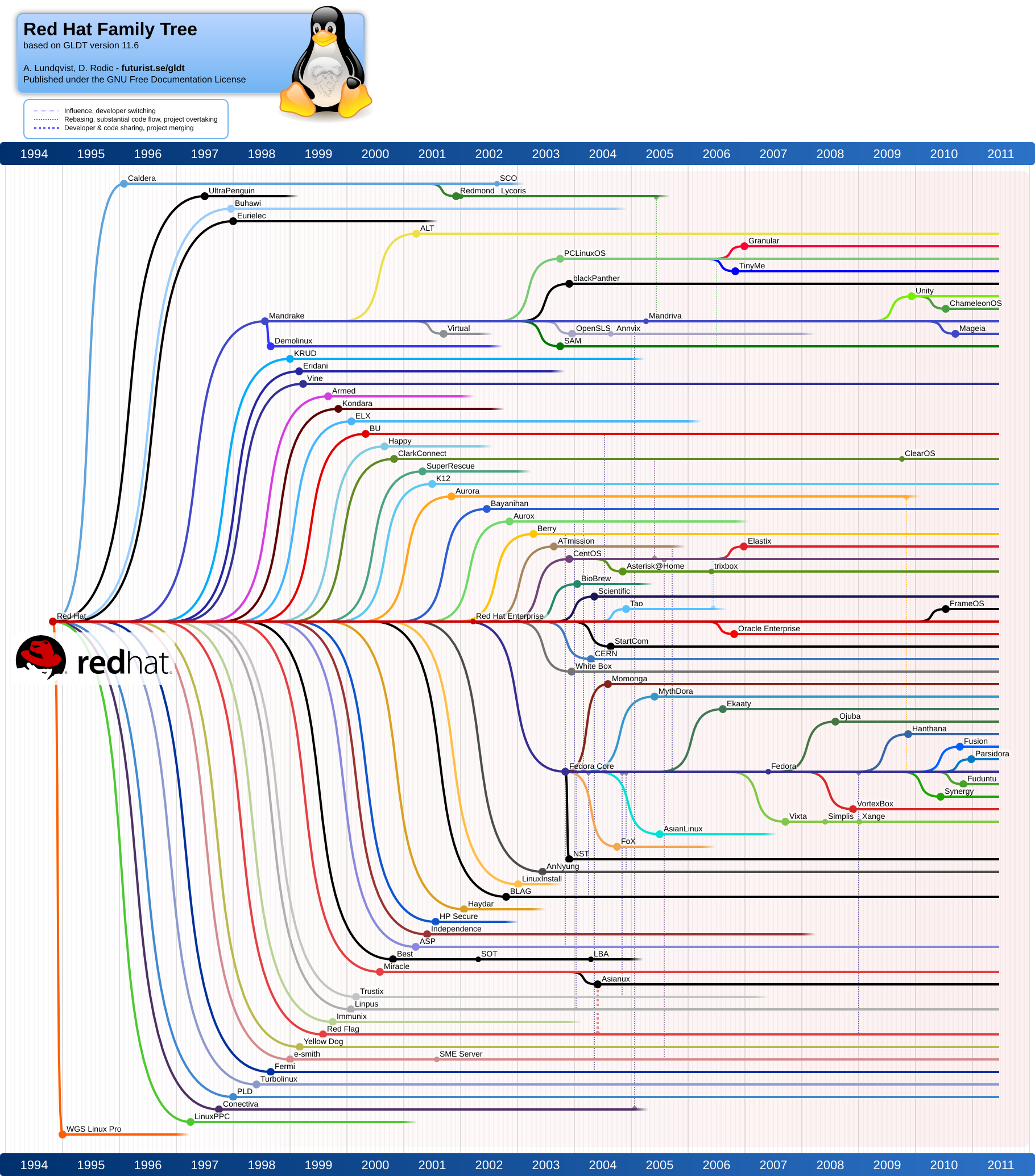
Red Hat family tree

Red Hat Enterprise Linux derivatives are Linux distributions that are based on the Red Hat Enterprise Linux (RHEL) Linux distribution.

== History ==
Red Hat Linux was a popular Linux distribution largely because, while there was a paid-for supported version, a freely downloadable one was also available. Since the only difference between the paid-for option and the free option was support, a great number of people chose to use the free version.

In 2003, Red Hat made the decision to change its Red Hat Linux product into Red Hat Enterprise Linux for customers who were willing to pay for it.

A community-driven Red Hat based Linux distribution called Fedora was available free of charge.

Fedora has its own beta cycle and has some issues fixed by contributors, who occasionally included Red Hat staff. However, its quick and nonconservative release cycle means it might not be suitable for some users.

Today, Fedora serves as the primary upstream development branch for CentOS Stream, and in turn for Red Hat Enterprise Linux.

== Features ==
The Red Hat Enterprise Linux derivatives generally include the union set, which is included in the different versions of RHEL. The version numbers are typically identical to the ones featured in RHEL; as such, the free versions maintain binary compatibility with the paid-for version, which means software intended for RHEL typically also runs on a free version. Relatively few changes need to be made to the distributions.

== Legal aspects ==
Free redistributions are expressly encouraged by the GNU General Public License upon which Red Hat's distributions are derived. However, to avoid misrepresentation of Red Hat's trademark, material in the original distribution covered by the trademark must be stripped off or removed from the redistribution.

Where distributions (e.g., CentOS) have not been deemed sufficiently thorough in removing references to Red Hat, they have received warnings from Red Hat's legal counsel. CentOS received such a notice seeking to have it remove all mention of Red Hat's asserted trademarks from their website and their distribution. Until the dispute was resolved, references to Red Hat were replaced by "a PNAELV (Prominent North American Enterprise Linux Vendor)".

== Notable Red Hat Enterprise Linux derivatives ==
- AlmaLinux – A 100% Community-owned and governed replacement for CentOS developed under the 501(c)(6) non-profit, AlmaLinux OS Foundation.
- Bull's XBAS or bullx – (for high-performance computing)
- Circle Linux – an open source and community-driven distribution aiming for full compatibility.
- EulerOS – certified to The Open Group's UNIX 03 standard.
- EuroLinux – created by EuroLinux company freely distributed in the open core model. Besides standard paid support company offers forking and rebuilding from sources for special purposes. Previous versions were built on top of Scientific Linux.
- Inspur K-UX – certified to The Open Group's UNIX 03 standard.
- MIRACLE LINUX – an enterprise Linux distribution developed by Cybertrust Japan.
- NethServer – a Linux server distribution offering services configurable via WebGUI.
- Oracle Linux – free to download, distribute and use with public access to the latest errata and patches from the Oracle Linux yum server. Optional paid support subscriptions are available from Oracle.
- Oreon.
- RedSleeve Linux – an ARMv5 and ARMv6 build of EL6, EL7, EL8 an EL9 for older devices that don't meet the requirements for other ARM EL distributions
- Rocky Linux – a community-supported replacement for CentOS initiated by CentOS founder Gregory Kurtzer.
- Redpesk - a secure embedded Linux targeting industrial connected devices with very long term support made by IoT.bzh
- Springdale Linux – formerly PUIAS Linux is a complete operating system for desktops and servers, built by compiling the source packages for Red Hat Enterprise Linux.
- VzLinux – made by Virtuozzo and optimized to run in containers, virtual machines or on bare-metal servers.

Appliance-oriented derivatives based on RHEL:

- Amazon.com Amazon Linux AMI – RHEL7 userland with a linux-xen-kernel
- Google Search Appliance – derived from CentOS
- VMware ESX's Service Console software

Distributions which have ceased production or outdated:

- CAOS Linux – (multiple lineage)
- CentOS – (last version release 8, 2019-09-24, version 7 gets maintenance updates until 2024-06-30)
- ClearOS
- ClefOS – a port of CentOS for IBM Z by Sine Nomine Associates.
- Fermi Linux – a.k.a. Fermi Scientific Linux, derived from Scientific Linux with additional software specific for the Fermilab research facilities
- Rocks Cluster Distribution – derived from RHEL (earlier versions) and CentOS (recent releases)
- ROSA Enterprise Linux Server
- Scientific Linux – (version 7 gets maintenance updates until 2024-06-30)
- SME Server – made by the Koozali Foundation (version 10 based on CentOS 7 gets maintenance updates until 2024-06-30)
- StartCom Enterprise Linux
- White Box Enterprise Linux – No formal announcement but no longer actively developed
- Yellow Dog Linux

== See also ==
- EPEL, Extra Packages for Enterprise Linux
- List of commercial products based on Red Hat Enterprise Linux
- Long-term support
