= Enterprise Linux (disambiguation) =

Enterprise Linux most often refers to Red Hat Enterprise Linux.

Enterprise Linux may also refer to the Linux distributions:

- SUSE Linux Enterprise
- Oracle Linux, formerly Oracle Enterprise Linux
- Community Enterprise Operating System (CentOS)

== See also ==
- Linux
- Enterprise computing
