= ClearCenter =

New Zealand software company

- Type: Private
- Industry: Information technology
- Founded: 2009; 17 years ago
- Founder: Michael Proper
- Headquarters: New Zealand
- Area served: Worldwide
- Key people: Michael Proper; David Loper; Devin Johnson
- Products: ClearOS; ClearVM; ClearCARE; ClearBOX; ClearSDN; ClearAP; Hybrid Controller
- Website: clearcenter.com

ClearCenter is headquartered in New Zealand and has its primary product offices in Orem, Utah, along with marketing, support, research and development facilities in several countries, including Canada, Taiwan, China, Netherlands, UK and India. The company develops Hybrid Products for a type of Managed Service Provider, known as the emerging Hybrid Service Provider.

Many of Clear Center’s products are based upon Clear Foundation’s Clear OS, an open source software operating system).

== History ==
ClearCenter was founded by Michael Proper in 2009. Before founding ClearCenter, Michael Proper founded another company in 2000 named DirectPointe which helped to create and grow the Managed Service Provider (MSP) sector. It was ranked No. 1 in the top 100 Managed Service Providers globally in 2007 and 2008.

ClearCenter currently has customers in over 150 countries.

== Products ==
Most of the products by ClearCenter are open source with a community version and free-to-use. The ClearCenter WebConfig and ClearSDN have fully developed APIs that are open to developers' use.

=== ClearOS Software ===
ClearOS is a Linux distribution, based upon Red Hat Enterprise Linux and CentOS. The ClearOS Community offering is licensed and managed by ClearFoundation. It first launched in 2002 under the name of ClarkConnect, and later changed to its present name in 2009 with the release of ClearOS 5.1 version on October 6, 2009. The current stable version is 7.2, and the beta version is 7.3. ClearOS is offered in two editions - Community and Professional. The Community edition is all free/open source software and free of cost. The Professional edition is a paid version, with a monthly fee to specified ClearCenter's partners.

== Acquisitions ==
- Witsbits (2015)
