= List of commercial products based on Red Hat Enterprise Linux =

There are a number of commercial products based on Red Hat Enterprise Linux (RHEL). Information about these products and the version of RHEL they are based on is often difficult to come by, since this fact is not widely publicised. Sometimes it is possible to run the 'uname -r' command to get the kernel release and then cross-reference it with the RHEL version history.

== Examples ==
- Asianux
  - Asianux 1.0 is based on Red Hat Enterprise Linux 3.0.
  - Asianux 2.0 is based on Red Hat Enterprise Linux 4.0.
- Autodesk Media and Entertainment
  - Autodesk's Smoke, Flame and Lustre software all run on HP z800 machines pre-configured with a custom RHEL 5 distribution. An additional software package called the 'Discreet Kernel Utility' or DKU is added for additional proprietary device drivers and resources.
- Avaya
  - Avaya's Communication Manager VoIP-PBX software is based on Red Hat Enterprise Linux 5.
- Amazon.com
  - Amazon Linux available as the default Linux distribution on Amazon Web Services.
- F5 Networks BIG-IP
  - The BIG-IP product line runs an operating system derived from Red Hat Enterprise Linux 6.5. Upgraded in version TMOS v.12.
- Check Point SecurePlatform
  - Check Point SecurePlatform NG is based on Red Hat Linux 7.2
  - Check Point SecurePlatform NGX is based on Red Hat Enterprise Linux 3.0
  - Check Point SecurePlatform 2.6 has kernel based on Red Hat Enterprise Linux 5 and user space based on RHEL 3
  - Check Point SecurePlatform R70 is based on Red Hat Enterprise Linux 5.
  - Check Point Gaia is based on Red Hat Enterprise Linux 5.2.
  - Check Point SecurePlatform VSX R67 is based on Red Hat Enterprise Linux 5.2.
- Cisco
  - Cisco Global Site Selector
  - Cisco Unified Communications Manager
  - Cisco Secure ACS (RADIUS and TACACS+ server)
- CloudLinux OS
  - CloudLinux OS 5 is based on Red Hat Enterprise Linux 5.0
  - CloudLinux OS 6 is based on Red Hat Enterprise Linux 6.0
  - CloudLinux OS 7 is based on Red Hat Enterprise Linux 7.0
  - CloudLinux OS 8 is based on Red Hat Enterprise Linux 8.0
- Crossbeam Systems
  - COS - operating system for C-series of appliances
  - XOS - operating system for X-series of appliances
- Egenera cBlade - Red Hat Enterprise Linux 2.1
  - Egenera BladeFrame OS 3.2 runs kernel 2.4.9−e.39
  - Egenera BladeFrame OS 4.0 runs kernel 2.4.9−e.43
- Imperva
  - SecureSphere Database Security Gateway
- MIRACLE LINUX
- Oracle Linux
- Trend Micro Interscan Messaging Security Virtual Appliance 7.0 is based on CentOS 5.0 (a re-compilation of Red Hat Enterprise Linux 5.0)
- VMware ESXi is VMware's enterprise-class hypervisor. ESX, the older larger-footprint version, consisted of two parts: the VMkernel, a proprietary hypervisor kernel, and the Service Console, a Linux-based management interface. The Service Console was based on following Red Hat products:
  - ESX Server 2.x Service Console is based on Red Hat Linux 7.2.
  - ESX Server 3.0 Service Console is based on Red Hat Enterprise Linux 3.0 Update 6.
  - ESX Server 3.5 Service Console is based on Red Hat Enterprise Linux 3.0 Update 8.
  - ESX Server 4.0 Service Console is "compatible with" Red Hat Enterprise Linux 5.2.

== See also ==
- Red Hat Enterprise Linux derivatives
- List of Linux distributions
