= ClearFoundation =

Non-profit organisation

- Type: Privately held company
- Industry: Information technology
- Founded: 2009; 17 years ago
- Founder: Michael Proper, Gregory Jackson, John Fallentine, Ray Mihaere, David Loper and others
- Headquarters: New Zealand
- Area served: Worldwide
- Key people: Michael Proper, David Loper, Gregory Jackson and others
- Website: www.clear.foundation

ClearFoundation is a privately held company that develops and manages the source code and repository of its flagship operating system, ClearOS. The organization is headquartered in New Zealand.

== History ==
The ClearFoundation is a New Zealand company which, according to their website, was created in 2009 with the purpose of developing and maintaining ClearOS under an open source model.

From January 2012 to September 2015, ClearFoundation was registered as a technology research company. Later, in March 2019 it was registered as an internet consultancy service, until September 2021.

As of August 2023, they were not registered on the SEC EDGAR database, the New Zealand non-profit registry, or the IRS tax exempt organization database.

== Community ==
The ClearFoundation community has over 103,100 members from more than 150 countries. Community members can earn recognition (badges) by participating in community projects, forums, and other tasks associated to ClearOS.

== Projects ==
=== ClearOS Server ===
ClearOS is an open-source Linux distribution based on CentOS and Red Hat Enterprise Linux. Initially, the software was launched as ClarkConnect in 2002 and got its present name in 2009. Paid versions of ClearOS and the ClearOS Marketplace are developed and supported by ClearCenter. ClearOS is specifically designed for small and medium enterprises as a network gateway and network server with web-based administration interface.
