= Rocky Linux =

Operating system by Rocky Enterprise Software Foundation

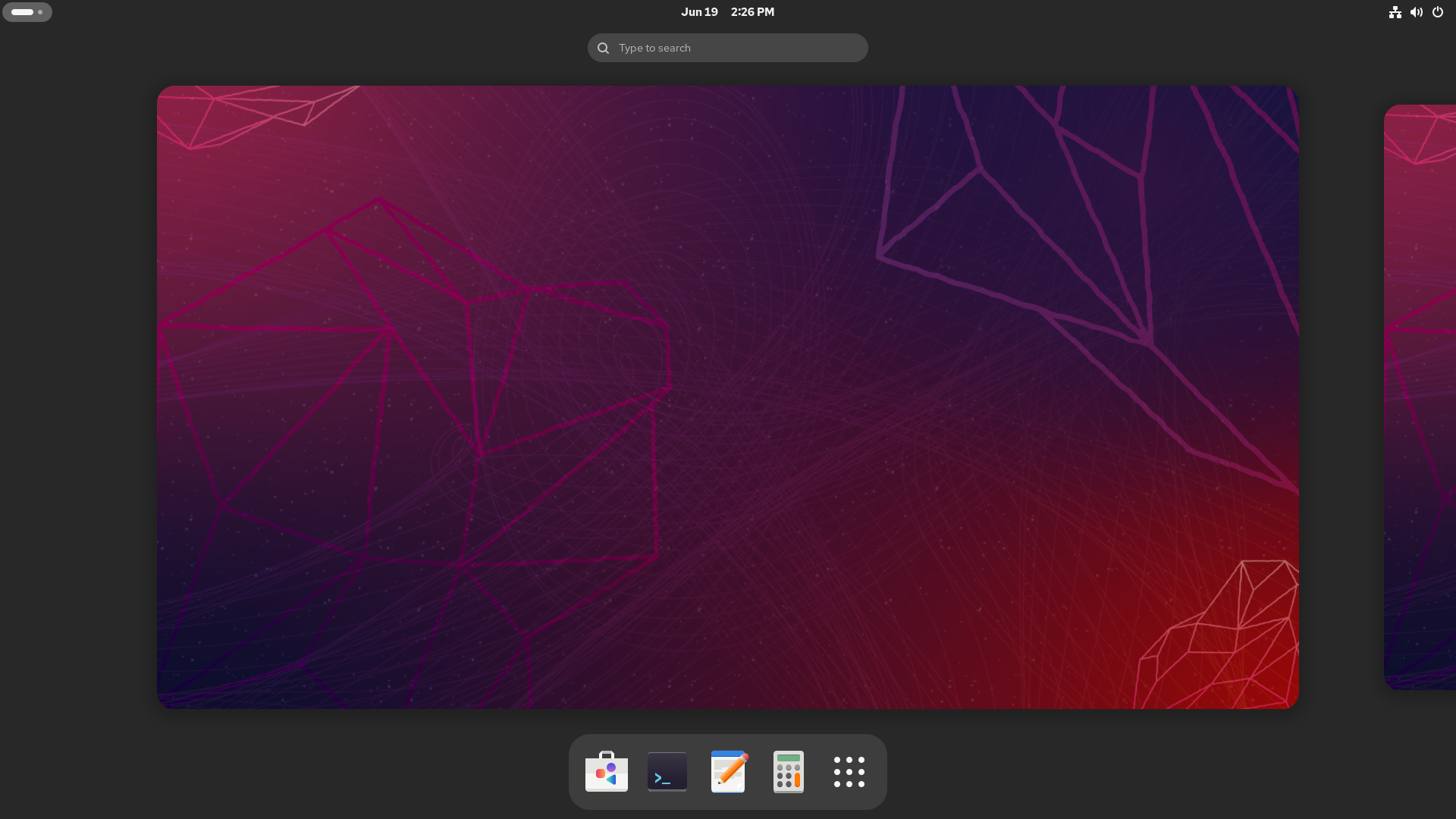
- Rocky Linux 10.0, showing its desktop environment GNOME 47.
- Developer: Rocky Enterprise Software Foundation
- OS family: Linux (Unix-like)
- Working state: Current
- Source model: Open source
- Initial release: 1 May 2021; 5 years ago
Latest release
- 10: 10.3 / 16 November 2026; 1 day ago
- 9: 9.9 / 15 November 2026; 2 days ago
- 8: 8.10 / 30 May 2024; 2 years ago
- Repository: git.rockylinux.org
- Marketing target: Desktop computers, servers, workstations, supercomputers
- Package manager: RPM (DNF), Flatpak — graphical front-ends: GNOME Software, dnfdragora
- Supported platforms: x86-64 (x86-64-v3 for Rocky Linux 10), ARM64, ppc64le, s390x, RISC-V (Rocky Linux 10 only)
- Kernel type: Monolithic (Linux)
- Userland: GNU
- Default user interface: GNOME Shell, Bash
- License: 3-clause BSD and various free software licenses, plus proprietary firmware files
- Preceded by: CentOS
- Official website: rockylinux.org

Rocky Linux is a free and open source Linux distribution developed by Rocky Enterprise Software Foundation, which is a privately owned benefit corporation that describes itself as a "self-imposed not-for-profit". It is intended to be a downstream, complete binary-compatible release using the Red Hat Enterprise Linux (RHEL) operating system source code. The project's aim is to provide a community-supported, production-grade enterprise operating system. Rocky Linux, along with RHEL, has become popular for enterprise operating system use.

The first release candidate version of Rocky Linux was released on April 30, 2021, and its first general availability version was released on June 21, 2021. Rocky Linux 8 will be supported through May 2029, Rocky Linux 9 through May 2032, and Rocky Linux 10 through May 2035.

== History ==
On December 8, 2020, Red Hat announced that they would discontinue development of CentOS, which had been a production-ready downstream version of RHEL, in favor of a newer upstream development variant of that operating system known as CentOS Stream. In response, Gregory Kurtzer, CEO of CIQ (a Rocky Linux support provider) and one of the original founders of CentOS, announced that he would start a new project to achieve the original goals of CentOS. Its name was chosen as a tribute to early CentOS co-founder Rocky McGaugh. By December 12, the code repository of Rocky Linux had become the top-trending repository on GitHub.

On December 22, 2020, Rocky Linux community manager Jordan Pisaniello announced that the target for an initial release was anywhere between March and May of 2021. On January 20, 2021, it was announced that a test repository would be made available to the public by the end of February, and a release candidate was on target for the end of March 2021. However, that date was slightly pushed back, and on April 30, 2021, the first release candidate was officially released. The second release candidate, of version 8.4, the last before the stable release, was released on June 4, 2021. The high version number is based on the designation of RHEL. Rocky Linux is a clone of RHEL, which is also binary-compatible and is already supported by a number of large, financially strong sponsors, including CIQ, Amazon Web Services, Google Cloud, Microsoft Azure, MontaVista, and VMware. On June 21, 2021, the stable release of Rocky Linux 8.4 was released, with the code name "Green Obsidian".

Rocky Linux 9.0 was released on July 14, 2022, alongside a new reproducible build system called "Peridot", created to ensure the community can easily create new RHEL forks if Rocky Linux ever were to be discontinued, and to allow the Rocky Linux project to make new releases faster. Rocky Linux 9.0 is also the first version to support little-endian PowerPC processors and IBM Z (s390x) mainframes.

Rocky Linux 10.0 "Red Quartz" was released on June 11, 2025. It's the first version to support RISC-V architecture. Rocky Linux 10 also raises the baseline on 64-bit AMD and Intel systems to the x86-64-v3 microarchitecture level, dropping support for x86-64-v2 hardware and earlier.

== Releases ==
Some of the ISO images released by the Rocky Enterprise Software Foundation have no direct upstream equivalents. They are created for specific purposes, such as for providing a live bootable image, or for providing a reduced-size installation medium.

Rocky Linux releases
Rocky Linux version	Code Name	Architectures	RHEL base	Kernel	Rocky Linux release date	RHEL release date	Delay (days)
8.3	Green Obsidian	x86-64, ARM64	8.3	4.18.0-240	2021-05-01	2020-11-03	179 (Note: Rocky Linux was announced 8 December 2020, first beta release was 143 days later.)
8.4	Green Obsidian	x86-64, ARM64	8.4	4.18.0-305	2021-06-21	2021-05-18	34
8.5	Green Obsidian	x86-64, ARM64	8.5	4.18.0-348	2021-11-15	2021-11-09	6
8.6	Green Obsidian	x86-64, ARM64	8.6	4.18.0-372.9.1	2022-05-16	2022-05-10	6
8.7	Green Obsidian	x86-64, ARM64	8.7	4.18.0-425.3.1	2022-11-14	2022-11-09	5
8.8	Green Obsidian	x86-64, ARM64	8.8	4.18.0-477.10.1	2023-05-20	2023-05-16	4
8.9	Green Obsidian	x86-64, ARM64	8.9	4.18.0-513.5.1	2023-11-22	2023-11-14	8
8.10	Green Obsidian	x86-64, ARM64	8.10	4.18.0-553	2024-05-30	2024-05-22	8
9.0	Blue Onyx	x86-64-v2, ARM64, ppc64le, s390x	9.0	5.14.0-70.13.1	2022-07-14	2022-05-17	58
9.1	Blue Onyx	x86-64-v2, ARM64, ppc64le, s390x	9.1	5.14.0-162.6.1	2022-11-26	2022-11-15	11
9.2	Blue Onyx	x86-64-v2, ARM64, ppc64le, s390x	9.2	5.14.0-284.11.1	2023-05-16	2023-05-10	6
9.3	Blue Onyx	x86-64-v2, ARM64, ppc64le, s390x	9.3	5.14.0-362.8.1	2023-11-20	2023-11-07	13
9.4	Blue Onyx	x86-64-v2, ARM64, ppc64le, s390x	9.4	5.14.0-427.13.1	2024-05-09	2024-04-30	9
9.5	Blue Onyx	x86-64-v2, ARM64, ppc64le, s390x	9.5	5.14.0-503.14.1	2024-11-19	2024-11-12	7
9.6	Blue Onyx	x86-64-v2, ARM64, ppc64le, s390x	9.6	5.14.0-570.17.1	2025-06-04	2025-05-20	15
9.7	Blue Onyx	x86-64-v2, ARM64, ppc64le, s390x	9.7	5.14.0-611.9.1	2025-12-01	2025-11-11	20
9.8	Blue Onyx	x86-64-v2, ARM64, ppc64le, s390x	9.8	5.14.0-687.10.1	2026-05-27	2026-05-19	8
9.9	Blue Onyx	x86-64-v2, ARM64, ppc64le, s390x	9.9	5.14.0-741.22.1	2026-11-15	2026-11-11	4
10.0	Red Quartz	x86-64-v3, ARM64, ppc64le, s390x, riscv64	10.0	6.12.0-55.12.1	2025-06-11	2025-05-20	22
10.1	Red Quartz	x86-64-v3, ARM64, ppc64le, s390x, riscv64	10.1	6.12.0-124.8.1	2025-11-25	2025-11-11	14
10.2	Red Quartz	x86-64-v3, ARM64, ppc64le, s390x, riscv64	10.2	6.12.0-211.16.1	2026-05-28	2026-05-19	9
10.3	Red Quartz	x86-64-v3, ARM64, ppc64le, s390x, riscv64	10.3	6.12.0-264.16.1	2026-11-16	2026-11-11	5
Legend: Unsupported Supported Latest version

== See also ==
- Red Hat Enterprise Linux#Product life cycle
- Red Hat Enterprise Linux derivatives
- Fedora Linux
