= ClearOS =

Linux distribution

ClearCenter
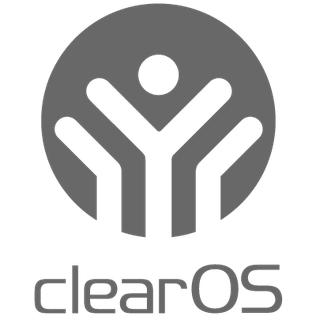
- Developer: ClearCenter
- OS family: Linux (Unix-like)
- Working state: stale
- Source model: Open source
- Initial release: 2001; 25 years ago
- Latest release: 7.8 / 23 June 2020; 6 years ago
- Kernel type: Monolithic kernel (Linux)
- Default user interface: Web user interface
- License: GPL, and others
- Official website: clearos.com

ClearOS (also known as the ClearOS System, formerly ClarkConnect) was a Linux distribution by ClearFoundation, with network gateway, file, print, mail, and messaging services.

== History ==
ClearOS is based on CentOS and Red Hat Enterprise Linux, designed for use in small and medium enterprises as a network gateway and network server with a web-based administration interface. ClearOS is the successor to ClarkConnect. The software is built by ClearFoundation, and support services can be purchased from ClearCenter. ClearOS 5.1 removes previous limitations to mail, DMZ, and MultiWAN functions.

As of the ClearOS 6.1 release, the distribution is a full-featured operating system for gateway, network and servers built from source packages for Red Hat Enterprise Linux.

ClearOS aimed to replace, as a small business server, Windows SBS.

The last release of ClearOS was in 2020, and with no updates since then, the project appears to be discontinued.

You can still download the distribution from their site and the version is listed as ClearOS-7.9.1.342252, dated October 13 2021.

== Features ==
Features include:

- Stateful firewall (iptables), networking and security
- Intrusion detection and prevention system (SNORT)
- Virtual private networking (IPsec, PPTP, OpenVPN)
- Web proxy, with content filtering and antivirus (Squid, DansGuardian)
- E-mail services (Webmail, Postfix, SMTP, POP3/s, IMAP/s)
- Groupware (Kolab)
- Database and web server (easy to deploy LAMP stack)
- File and print services (Samba and CUPS)
- Flexshares (unified multi-protocol storage which currently employs SMB, HTTP/S, FTP/S, and SMTP)
- MultiWAN (Internet fault tolerant design)
- Built-in reports for system statistics and services (MRTG and others)

== Awards and recognition ==
- August 2009: CompTIA Breakaway — ClearCenter's ClearOS wins 'Best New Product' at CompTIA Breakaway.
- August 2010: CompTIA Breakaway — ClearCenter's ClearOS repeats win for 'Best New Product' at CompTIA Breakaway.
- July 2012: Softpedia — An Open Source, free and powerful network and gateway Linux server operating system
- February 2014: IDG Security Firewall Distributions Review
- June 2015: Small Business Computing — The 5 Best Linux Servers for Small Business
- September 2015: LinuxVoice Service Distro — Group Test (see pages 58-63)

== See also ==
- Windows SBS
- ClarkConnect
- SmoothWall
- m0n0wall
- SME Server
- Zentyal
- ClearFoundation
