= Fedora Project =

Community that develops Fedora Linux operating system

- Founded: 22 September 2003; 23 years ago
- Founder: Warren Togami, Red Hat et al.
- Type: Community
- Purpose: Open source
- Location: Raleigh, North Carolina
- Coordinates: 35.7745°N 78.6379°W
- Products: Fedora Linux, 389 Directory Server
- Method: Artwork, development, documentation, promotion, and translation.
- Leader: Jef Spaleta
- Website: fedoraproject.org

The Fedora Project is an independent project under a legal responsibility of Red Hat to coordinate the development of Fedora Linux, a Linux-based operating system, operating with the mission of creating "an innovative platform for hardware, clouds, and containers that enables software developers and community members to build tailored solutions for their users".

The project also oversees Extra Packages for Enterprise Linux, a special interest group which maintains the eponymous packages. The project was founded in 2003 as a result of a merger between the Red Hat Linux (RHL) and Fedora Linux projects. It is sponsored by Red Hat primarily, but its employees make up only 35% of project contributors, and most of the over 2,000 contributors are unaffiliated members of the community.

== History ==
The Fedora Project was founded in November 2003 when Red Hat decided to split Red Hat Linux into Red Hat Enterprise Linux (RHEL) and a community-based operating system, Fedora. Red Hat Professional Workstation was created at this same time.

=== Fedora operating system ===
Fedora Linux, then known as "Fedora Core," was a fork of RHL launched in 2003. It was introduced as a free-of-cost, community-supported alternative intended for home use, shortly after Red Hat discontinued RHL in favor of Red Hat Enterprise Linux (RHEL). RHEL branches its releases from versions of Fedora.

Since the release of Fedora 21 in December 2014, three editions have been made available: personal computer, server and cloud computing. This was expanded to five editions for containerization and Internet of Things (IoT) as of the release of Fedora 37 in November 2022. A new version of Fedora Linux is released every six months.

The current release is Fedora 45, which was released on 3 November 2026.

=== Security intrusion ===
In August 2008, several Fedora servers were compromised. Upon investigation it was found that one of the compromised servers was used for signing Fedora update packages. The Fedora Project stated that the attackers did not get the package signing key which could be used to introduce malicious software onto Fedora users' systems through the update process. Project administrators performed checks on the software and did not find anything to suggest that a Trojan horse had been introduced into the software. As a precaution the project converted to new package signing keys. Fedora published the full details on March 30, 2009.

== Governance ==
The Fedora Project is not a separate legal entity or organization; Red Hat retains liability for its actions. The Fedora Council is the top-level community leadership and governance body. The Council is composed of a mix of representatives from different areas of the project, named roles appointed by Red Hat, and a variable number of seats connected to medium-term project goals. The previous governance structure (Fedora Board) comprised five Red Hat appointed members and five community-elected members. Additionally, Fedora Project leader had a veto power over any board decision; in the current model, all voting members can block on issues, with a valid reason. Red Hat at one point announced intentions to create a separate Fedora Foundation to govern the project, but after consideration of a variety of issues, canceled it in favor of the board model then in place.

The community is also involved in organizing lower levels of leadership, both the Fedora Engineering Steering Committee (FESCo) and the Mindshare Committee (responsible for technical and community oversight, respectively) are community-elected bodies which manage significant portions of the project.

The project facilitates online communication among its developers and community members through public mailing lists and wiki pages. It also coordinates a main event, known as Flock (or Flock to Fedora) Task-specific, flexibly scheduled events known as Fedora Activity Days also gather many project contributors together in various regions.

== Sub-projects ==
=== Extra Packages for Enterprise Linux (EPEL) ===
EPEL is a repository of extra packages published by the Fedora project, which can be expected to work in Red Hat Enterprise Linux (RHEL) and Red Hat Enterprise Linux derivatives systems. EPEL is organised by a Fedora Special Interest Group. EPEL packages are usually based on their Fedora counterparts and will never conflict with or replace packages in the base Enterprise Linux distributions. EPEL uses much of the same infrastructure as Fedora, including buildsystem, Bugzilla instance, updates manager, mirror manager and more.

== See also ==
- Fedora Linux
- Fedora Linux Rawhide
- 389 Directory Server
