= Koozali SME Server =

SME server
- Developer: Koozali Foundation
- OS family: Linux (Unix-like)
- Working state: Active
- Source model: Open-source
- Initial release: 1999; 27 years ago
- Latest release: 11 / 29 September 2026; 43 days ago
- Supported platforms: x86-64
- Kernel type: Monolithic (Linux)
- Userland: GNU, POSIX
- Official website: koozali.org

Koozali SME server (also known as the SME Server, formerly e-smith server and gateway) is a Linux distribution based on Red Hat Enterprise Linux and can act as a server-only or server and gateway. Core features include internet services such as HTTP, FTP or email servers and firewall. It is also geared towards the deployment of local network utilities like file servers, print servers and anti-virus filters. An intuitive web interface allows administrators to monitor, deploy and maintain services.

The distribution is non-commercial and community based.

== History ==
The distribution was created under the name of e-smith server and gateway in 1999, by the eponymous company e-smith inc. founded by Joseph and Kim Morrison in 1998. When e-smith inc. was acquired by Mitel Networks in 2001, the distribution was rebranded Mitel SME Server. Mitel decided to end support for SME in the end of November 2003 to focus on its commercial version Managed Application Server (6000 MAS). The project was taken over by volunteer developers using the domain contribs.org renaming the distribution SME Server. The domain was already used at that time as a home for third-party extensions to the software.

The website was first hosted by Resource Strategies. In September 2004, Lycoris intended to make a new commercial support and platform based on SME Server, and move contribs.org to its data center. In December 2004, Lycoris ceased development efforts and site hosting before being bought by Mandriva in June 2005.

In December 2004, the site was moved to back Resource Strategies.

In April 2005, developers from the community moved the code to SourceForge.

In June 2005, Ruffdogs took over web site hosting and posts the Social Contract. Ruffdogs was officially acquired by Holonyx Inc. on March 1, 2007. SME Server inc. was registered in Colorado in 2005 june 23 to receive donation. From there, a community governance took form.

In 2009, the community took its independence from external corporations and started receiving its own donations.

From 2009 to 2013, the distribution was hosted at Shad Lords, SME developer, on a small dedicated server farm. There have been contact between ClearOS and SME Server developers for few years. In june 2013, while the server farm was shared with ClearOS, it has been moved to ClearOS center.

In 2013, members of the community decided to incorporate the Koozali Foundation as a non-profit to represent the community and the distribution. In 2014, Koozali Foundation chose to detach from ClearFoundation and moved its infrastructure to a server monthly rented by the foundation to host and build the distribution since. The Koozali name has to be chosen after viewing that SME Server name was use all over the world and it was hard to keep the community identity. As an example the Logo was at this time a trademark of a SME Server Incorporated company in Utah.

Around 2014, NethServer forked from SME Server. Two French partial forks also existed in early 2000's, SMERP and Free-EOS.

== Principle of operation ==
The SME Server is oriented toward small and medium-sized enterprises (SME) and home users. It embrace the KISS principle to allow a basic user to administer a server without an IT department. The upstream RHEL has been chosen for year for its long term release cycle, which ease maintenance in a SME context. The distribution is known to be easy to install and fast to set up and secure. The distro uses a simple but efficient web manager interface to create users, groups, file shares and doing basic administrative tasks. Configuration is stored in a flat-file database and system of template is then used to generate the configuration files of every core service of the server. This guarantee stability of the server in case of manual intervention on the service configuration files, a simple reboot and reconfiguration allow to recover the original state of the server.

== Core Features ==
- HTTP server : apache httpd
- FTP server : ProFTPD
- SMTP server : Qpsmtpd and Qmail
- Spamfilter : using Qpsmtpd plugins and Spamassassin
- IMAP and POP3 server: Dovecot
- Antivirus : Clamav
- DNS cache and server : dnscache and tinydns from Djbdns
- Firewall : Iptables
- File share : Samba
- DHCP server
- Backup
- Webmail : Horde

== Releases ==
Release	Date	End of life	RHEL based on	Based on
7.1	December 31, 2006	February 29, 2012	4.7	CentOS 4.x
8.0	May 25, 2012	March 31, 2017	5	CentOS 5.x
9.0	May 12, 2014	November 30, 2020	6	CentOS 6.x
10	June 6, 2021	June 30, 2024	7	CentOS 7.x
11	September 29, 2026	May 2029	8	Rocky Linux 8.10

== See also ==
- ClearOS
- Zentyal
