= Oracle Linux =

Linux distribution by Oracle

Oracle Linux 10

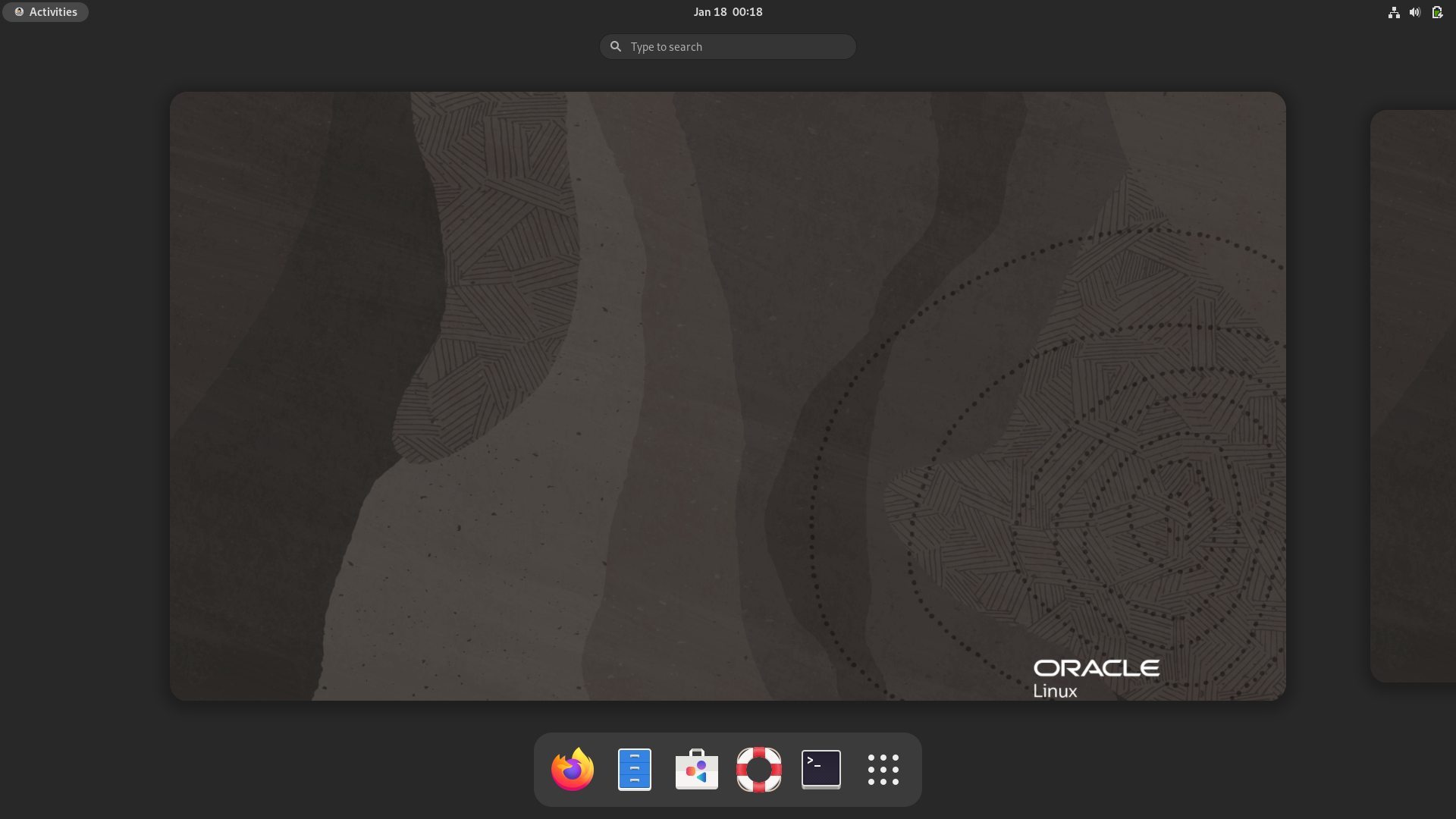
- Oracle Linux 9.5
- Developer: Oracle Corporation
- OS family: Linux (Unix-like)
- Working state: Current
- Source model: Open source
- Initial release: 4.5 / 26 October 2006; 20 years ago
- Latest release: 10.1 / 2 December 2025; 10 months ago
- Marketing target: Enterprise and cloud computing
- Update method: DNF (PackageKit)
- Package manager: RPM Package Manager
- Supported platforms: x86-64, ARM64
- Kernel type: Monolithic (Linux)
- Default user interface: GNOME and KDE (user-selectable)
- License: GNU GPL & various others
- Official website: oracle.com/linux

Oracle Linux (abbreviated OL, formerly known as Oracle Enterprise Linux or OEL) is a Linux distribution packaged and freely distributed by Oracle, available partially under the GNU General Public License since late 2006. It is, in part, compiled from Red Hat Enterprise Linux (RHEL) source code, replacing Red Hat branding with Oracle's. It is also used by Oracle Cloud and Oracle Engineered Systems such as Oracle Exadata and others.

Potential users can freely download Oracle Linux through Oracle's server, or from a variety of mirror sites, and can deploy and distribute it without cost. The company's Oracle Linux Support program aims to provide commercial technical support, covering Oracle Linux and existing RHEL or CentOS installations but without any certification from the former (i.e. without re-installation or re-boot). As of 2016, Oracle Linux has over 15,000 customers subscribed to the support program.

== RHEL compatibility ==
Oracle Corporation distributes Oracle Linux with two Linux kernels options:

- Red Hat Compatible Kernel (RHCK) – identical to the kernel shipped in RHEL
- Unbreakable Enterprise Kernel (UEK) – based on newer mainline Linux kernel versions, with Oracle's own enhancements for OLTP, InfiniBand, SSD disk access, NUMA-optimizations, Reliable Datagram Sockets (RDS), async I/O, OCFS2, Btrfs and networking.

Oracle Linux is application binary compatible with RHEL. Oracle claims that existing applications run unchanged because all application interfaces are identical to RHEL.

In August 2023, CIQ, Oracle, and SUSE founded Open Enterprise Linux Association (OpenELA) to collaborate on Enterprise Linux as an open source project to provide open and free Enterprise Linux source code. In November 2023, OpenELA publicly released Enterprise Linux source code and achieved important technical and governance milestones.

== Hardware and software compatibility ==
Oracle Linux is certified on servers including from Cisco, Dell, HPE, IBM, and Lenovo. In July 2023, HPE and Supermicro announced Oracle Linux support on their Arm-based servers.

Third-party software that ISVs have certified to run on Oracle Linux and Oracle VM can be found in this catalog Oracle/Sun servers with x86-64 processors can be configured to ship with Oracle Linux.

Oracle Linux is available on Amazon EC2 as an Amazon Machine Image, and on Microsoft Azure as a VM Image.

Oracle Linux is also available as a Windows app through the Microsoft Store and with the Windows Subsystem for Linux (WSL).

== Virtualization support ==
The Oracle Linux distribution includes KVM hypervisor and an oVirt-based management tool. Other supported server virtualization solutions are VMware and Xen-based Oracle VM.

Oracle Cloud Native Environment has added KubeVirt support for unified container and virtual machine management beginning with the 1.7 release.

== Container and orchestration support ==
Linux Containers (LXC) are supported in Oracle Linux 7.

Oracle Container Runtime for Docker is available on Oracle Linux 6 and 7. It’s not provided in Oracle Linux 8+.

Podman is a drop-in replacement for Oracle Container Runtime for Docker in Oracle Linux 8 and Oracle Linux 9. Podman, Buildah, and Skopeo are a set of tools that you can use to create, run, and manage applications across Oracle Linux systems by using Open Container Initiative (OCI) compatible containers.

Oracle Cloud Native Environment has integrated container runtimes to create and provision Open Container Initiative (OCI)-compliant containers using CRI-O, an implementation of the Kubernetes CRI (Container Runtime Interface) to enable using Open Container Initiative compatible runtimes.

Oracle Linux Container images are available via Oracle Container Registry, GitHub Container Registry and Docker Hub.

== Deployment inside Oracle Corporation ==
Oracle Corporation uses Oracle Linux extensively within Oracle Public Cloud, internally to lower IT costs. Oracle Linux is deployed on more than 42,000 servers by Oracle Global IT; the SaaS Oracle On Demand service, Oracle University, and Oracle's technology demo systems also run Oracle Linux.

Software developers at Oracle develop Oracle Database, Fusion Middleware, E-Business Suite and other components of Oracle Applications on Oracle Linux.

== Related products ==
Oracle Linux is used as the underlying operating system for the following appliances.

- Oracle Exadata
- Oracle Private Cloud Appliance
- Oracle Big Data Appliance
- Oracle Exalytics
- Oracle Database Appliance

== Specific additions ==
- Oracle Linux Automation Manager Is based on open source AWX project, is a task engine and web interface for scheduling and running Ansible playbooks
- Oracle Cloud Native Environment, a CNCF certified Kubernetes distribution, is a fully integrated suite for the development and deployment of cloud native applications.
- Oracle Linux Virtualization Manager Is an oVirt-based management tool to configure, monitor, and manage an Oracle Linux KVM-based environment.
- Ksplice – Oracle acquired Ksplice Inc in 2011, and offers Oracle Linux users Ksplice to enable hot kernel patching
- DTrace – As of October 2011, Oracle has begun porting DTrace from Solaris as a Linux kernel module
- Oracle Linux Manager manages the Oracle Linux software lifecycle.
- OS Management Hub Is a managed service that manages and monitors the updates and patches for Oracle Linux systems through a centralized management console hosted on Oracle Cloud Infrastructure.

== Benchmark submissions ==
=== Sun Fire systems ===
In March 2012, Oracle submitted a TPC-C benchmark result using an x86 Sun Fire server running Oracle Linux and Unbreakable Enterprise Kernel. With 8 Intel Xeon processors running Oracle DB 11 R2, the system was benchmarked at handling over 5.06 million tpmC (New-Order transactions per minute while fulfilling TPC-C). The server was rated at the time as the third-fastest TPC-C non-clustered system and the fastest x86-64 non-clustered system.

Oracle also submitted a SPECjEnterprise2010 benchmark record using Oracle Linux and Oracle WebLogic Server, and achieved both a single node and an x86 world record result of 27,150 EjOPS (SPECjEnterprise Operation/second).

=== Cisco UCS systems ===
Cisco submitted 2 TPC-C benchmark results that run Oracle Linux with the Unbreakable Enterprise Kernel R2 on UCS systems. The UCS systems rank fourth and eighth on the top TPC-C non-clustered list.

== SPARC version ==
In December 2010, Oracle CEO Larry Ellison, in response to a question on Oracle's Linux strategy, said that at some point in the future Oracle Linux would run on Oracle's SPARC platforms. At Oracle OpenWorld 2014 John Fowler, Oracle's Executive Vice President for Systems, also said that Linux will be able to run on SPARC at some point.

In October 2015, Oracle released a Linux reference platform for SPARC systems based on Red Hat Enterprise Linux 6.

In September 2016, Oracle released information about an upcoming product, Oracle Exadata SL6-2, a database server using SPARC processors running Linux.

On 31 March 2017, Oracle posted the first public release of Oracle Linux for SPARC, installable on SPARC T4, T5, M5, and M7 processors. The release notes state that the release is being made available "for the benefit of developers and partners", but is only supported on Exadata SL6 hardware.

== Software updates and version history ==
In March 2012, Oracle announced free software updates and errata for Oracle Linux on Oracle's public yum repositories. In September 2013, Oracle announced that each month its free public yum servers handle 80 TB of data, and the switch to the Akamai content delivery network to handle the traffic growth.

=== Support period ===
Version	End of Premier Support	End of Extended Support
3	31 October 2011	—N/a
4	28 February 2013	—N/a
5	30 June 2017	30 November 2020
6	31 March 2021	31 December 2024
7	31 December 2024	30 June 2028
8	31 July 2029	31 July 2032
9	30 June 2032	30 June 2035
10	30 June 2035	30 June 2038
Legend: Unsupported Supported

=== Release history ===
- Oracle Linux 10, 10.1, 10.2
- Oracle Linux 9, 9.1, 9.2, 9.3, 9.4, 9.5, 9.6, 9.7, 9.8
- Oracle Linux 8, 8.1, 8.2, 8.3, 8.4, 8.5, 8.6, 8.7, 8.8, 8.9, 8.10
- Oracle Linux 7, 7.1, 7.2, 7.3, 7.4, 7.5, 7.6, 7.7, 7.8, 7.9
- Oracle Linux 6, 6.1, 6.2, 6.3, 6.4, 6.5, 6.6, 6.7, 6.8, 6.9, 6.10
- Oracle Linux 5, 5.1, 5.2, 5.3, 5.4, 5.5, 5.6, 5.7, 5.8, 5.9, 5.10, 5.11
- Oracle Enterprise Linux 4.4, 4.5, 4.6, 4.7, 4.8, 4.9

Oracle Linux uses a version-naming convention identical to that of Red Hat Enterprise Linux (e.g. the first version, Oracle Linux 4.5, is based on RHEL 4.5). They have slightly different support lifecycles.

Oracle Linux versions starting with version 5.5 offer an Unbreakable Enterprise Kernel option, which is available as one of the Kernel options for Oracle Linux besides the default Red Hat Linux Kernel, the UEK versions in the table listed are their default version.

Some Oracle Linux releases support multiple Unbreakable Enterprise Kernel versions, some depending on the host machine architecture. UEK 2 is the last UEK kernel version for 32 bit x86 (i386) and SPARC machines, therefore UEK 3 and newer versions requiring an x86-64 host CPU, UEK 5 add support for ARM AArch64 CPUs, however, Oracle Linux in AArch64 hosts are only supported with the UEK kernel, making the RHCK kernel option unavailable in ARM systems.

Oracle Linux Release	Architectures	RHEL base	UEK kernel	RHCK kernel	Oracle Linux release date	RHEL release date	Days after RHEL release
4.5	i386, x86-64	4.5	N/A	kernel-2.6.9-55	2007-05-01	?	
4.6	i386, x86-64	4.6	N/A	kernel-2.6.9-67	2007-12-10	2007-11-16	24
4.7	i386, x86-64	4.7	N/A	kernel-2.6.9-78	2008-08-05	2008-07-24	12
4.8	i386, x86-64	4.8	N/A	kernel-2.6.9-89	2009-05-26	2009-05-18	8
4.9	i386, x86-64	4.9	N/A	kernel-2.6.9-100	2011-02-16	?	
5.0	i386, x86-64	5	N/A	kernel-2.6.18-8	2007-06-26	2007-03-14	104
5.1	i386, x86-64	5.1	N/A	kernel-2.6.18-53	2007-11-26	2007-11-07	19
5.2	i386, x86-64	5.2	N/A	kernel-2.6.18-92	2008-06-02	2008-05-21	12
5.3	i386, x86-64	5.3	N/A	kernel-2.6.18-128	2009-01-28	2009-01-20	8
5.4	i386, x86-64, ia64	5.4	N/A	kernel-2.6.18-164	2009-09-09	2009-09-02	7
5.5	i386, x86-64, ia64	5.5	kernel-uek-2.6.32-100.0.19	kernel-2.6.18-194	2010-04-07	2010-03-31	7
5.6	i386, x86-64, ia64	5.6	kernel-uek-2.6.32-100.26.2	kernel-2.6.18-238	2011-01-22	2011-01-13	9
5.7	i386, x86-64, ia64	5.7	kernel-uek-2.6.32-200.13.1	kernel-2.6.18-274	2011-08-16	2011-07-21	26
5.8	i386, x86-64, ia64	5.8	kernel-uek-2.6.32-300.10.1	kernel-2.6.18-308	2012-03-02	2012-02-21	10
5.9	i386, x86-64, ia64	5.9	kernel-uek-2.6.39-300.26.1	kernel-2.6.18-348	2013-01-16	2013-01-07	9
5.10	i386, x86-64, ia64	5.10	kernel-uek-2.6.39-400.209.1	kernel-2.6.18-371	2013-10-08	2013-10-01	7
5.11	i386, x86-64, ia64	5.11	kernel-uek-2.6.39-400.215.10	kernel-2.6.18-398	2014-09-23	2014-09-16	7
6.0	i386, x86-64	6	kernel-uek-2.6.32-100.28.5	kernel-2.6.32-71	2011-02-11	2010-11-10	93
6.1	i386, x86-64	6.1	kernel-uek-2.6.32-100.34.1	kernel-2.6.32-131.0.15	2011-06-01	2011-05-19	13
6.2	i386, x86-64	6.2	kernel-uek-2.6.32-300.3.1	kernel-2.6.32-220	2011-12-15	2011-12-06	9
6.3	i386, x86-64	6.3	kernel-uek-2.6.39-200.24.1	kernel-2.6.32-279	2012-06-28	2012-06-21	7
6.4	i386, x86-64	6.4	kernel-uek-2.6.39-400.17.1	kernel-2.6.32-358	2013-02-28	2013-02-21	7
6.5	i386, x86-64	6.5	kernel-uek-3.8.13-16.2.1 (x86-64) kernel-uek-2.6.39-400.211.1 (i386)	kernel-2.6.32-431	2013-11-27	2013-11-21	6
6.6	i386, x86-64	6.6	kernel-uek-3.8.13-44.1.1 (x86-64) kernel-uek-2.6.39-400.215.10 (i386)	kernel-2.6.32-504	2014-10-21	2014-10-14	7
6.7	i386, x86-64	6.7	kernel-uek-3.8.13-68.3.4 (x86-64) kernel-uek-2.6.39-400.250.7 (i386)	kernel-2.6.32-573	2015-07-31	2015-07-22	9
6.7	SPARC	6.7	kernel-uek-2.6.39-500.1.76	kernel-2.6.32-573	2017-03-31	2015-07-22	618
6.8	i386, x86-64	6.8	kernel-uek-4.1.12-37.4.1 (x86-64) kernel-uek-2.6.39-400.278.2 (i386)	kernel-2.6.32-642	2016-05-16	2016-05-10	6
6.9	i386, x86-64	6.9	kernel-uek-4.1.12-61.1.28 (x86-64) kernel-uek-2.6.39-400.294.3 (i386)	kernel-2.6.32-696	2017-03-28	2017-03-21	7
6.10	i386, x86-64	6.10	kernel-uek-4.1.12-124.16.4 (x86-64) kernel-uek-2.6.39-400.294.3 (i386)	kernel-2.6.32-754	2018-07-02	2018-06-19	13
7.0	x86-64	7.0	kernel-uek-3.8.13-35.3.1	kernel-3.10.0-123	2014-07-23	2014-06-10	43
7.1	x86-64	7.1	kernel-uek-3.8.13-55.1.6	kernel-3.10.0-229	2015-03-12	2015-03-05	7
7.2	x86-64	7.2	kernel-uek-3.8.13-98.7.1	kernel-3.10.0-327	2015-11-25	2015-11-19	6
7.3	x86-64	7.3	kernel-uek-4.1.12-61.1.18	kernel-3.10.0-514	2016-11-10	2016-11-03	6
7.4	x86-64	7.4	kernel-uek-4.1.12-94.3.9	kernel-3.10.0-693	2017-08-08	2017-07-31	8
7.5	x86-64	7.5	kernel-uek-4.1.12-112.16.4	kernel-3.10.0-862	2018-04-17	2018-04-10	7
7.6	x86-64, ARM64	7.6	kernel-uek-4.14.35-1818.3.3	kernel-3.10.0-957	2018-11-07	2018-10-30	8
7.7	x86-64, ARM64	7.7	kernel-uek-4.14.35-1902.3.2	kernel-3.10.0-1062	2019-08-15	2019-08-06	9
7.8	x86-64, ARM64	7.8	kernel-uek-4.14.35-1902.300.11	kernel-3.10.0-1127	2020-04-08	2020-03-31	8
7.9	x86-64, ARM64	7.9	kernel-uek-5.4.17-2011.6.2	kernel-3.10.0-1160	2020-10-07	2020-09-29	8
8.0	x86-64, ARM64	8.0	N/A	kernel-4.18.0-80	2019-07-18	2019-05-07	72
8.1	x86-64, ARM64	8.1	N/A	kernel-4.18.0-147	2019-11-15	2019-11-05	10
8.2	x86-64, ARM64	8.2	kernel-uek-5.4.17-2011.1.2	kernel-4.18.0-193	2020-05-06	2020-04-28	8
8.3	x86-64, ARM64	8.3	kernel-uek-5.4.17-2011.7.4	kernel-4.18.0-240	2020-11-13	2020-11-03	10
8.4	x86-64, ARM64	8.4	kernel-uek-5.4.17-2102.201.3	kernel-4.18.0-305	2021-05-26	2021-05-18	8
8.5	x86-64, ARM64	8.5	kernel-uek-5.4.17-2136.300.7	kernel-4.18.0-348	2021-11-16	2021-11-09	7
8.6	x86-64, ARM64	8.6	kernel-uek-5.4.17-2136.307.3	kernel-4.18.0-372.9.1	2022-05-16	2022-05-10	6
8.7	x86-64, ARM64	8.7	kernel-uek-5.15.0-3.60.5.1	kernel-4.18.0-425.3.1	2022-11-16	2022-11-09	7
8.8	x86-64, ARM64	8.8	kernel-uek-5.15.0-101.103.2.1	kernel-4.18.0-477.10.1	2023-05-24	2023-05-16	8
8.9	x86-64, ARM64	8.9	kernel-uek-5.15.0-200.131.27	kernel-4.18.0-513.5.1	2023-11-21	2023-11-14	7
8.10	x86-64, ARM64	8.10	kernel-uek-5.15.0-206.153.7	kernel-4.18.0-544	2024-05-29	2024-05-22	7
9.0	x86-64, ARM64	9.0	kernel-uek-5.15.0-0.30.19	kernel-5.14.0-70.13.1.0.3	2022-06-30	2022-05-17	44
9.1	x86-64, ARM64	9.1	kernel-uek-5.15.0-3.60.5.1	kernel-5.14.0-162.6.1	2022-11-23	2022-11-15	8
9.2	x86-64, ARM64	9.2	kernel-uek-5.15.0-101.103.2.1	kernel-5.14.0-284.11.1	2023-05-24	2023-05-10	14
9.3	x86-64, ARM64	9.3	kernel-uek-5.15.0-200.131.27	kernel-5.14.0-362.8.1	2023-11-15	2023-11-08	7
9.4	x86-64, ARM64	9.4	kernel-uek-5.15.0-205.149.5.1	kernel-5.14.0-427	2024-05-06	2024-04-30	6
9.5	x86-64, ARM64	9.5	kernel-uek-5.15.0-302.167.6	kernel-5.14.0-503.11.1	2024-11-19	2024-11-12	7
9.6	x86-64, ARM64	9.6	kernel-uek-6.12.0-1.23.3.2	kernel-5.14.0-570.12.1.0.1	2025-05-27	2025-05-20	7
9.7	x86-64, ARM64	9.7	kernel-uek-6.12.0-105.51.5	kernel-5.14.0-611.5.1	2025-11-25	2025-11-12	13
9.8	x86-64, ARM64	9.8	kernel-uek-6.12.0-203.76.7.3	kernel-5.14.0-687.5.3	2026-06-23	2026-05-19	35
10.0	x86-64, ARM64	10.0	kernel-uek-6.12.0-100.28.2	kernel-6.12.0-55.9.1.0.1	2025-06-26	2025-05-20	37
10.1	x86-64, ARM64	10.1	kernel-uek-6.12.0-105.51.5	kernel-6.12.0-124.8.1	2025-12-02	2025-11-12	20

=== Unbreakable Enterprise Kernel Release history ===
- UEK-NEXT (6.17.0) - Currently based in Linux Kernel 6.17. Development Kernel release that allows Oracle Linux users to try out the latest developments from upstream Linux combined with Oracle UEK-specific features.
- UEK8 (6.12.0-xxx) - Based in Linux Kernel 6.12 LTS. Available versions: 8.0, 8.1, 8.2
- UEK7 (5.15.0-xxx) - Based in Linux Kernel 5.15 LTS. Available versions: 7.0, 7.1, 7.2, 7.3
- UEK6 (5.4.17-xxx) - Based in Linux Kernel 5.4.17 LTS. Available versions: 6.0, 6.1, 6.2, 6.3
- UEK5 (4.14.35-xxx) - Based in Linux Kernel 4.14.35 LTS. Available versions: 5.0, 5.1, 5.2, 5.3, 5.4, 5.5
- UEK4 (4.1.12-xxx) - Based in Linux Kernel 4.1.12 LTS. Available versions: 4.0, 4.1, 4.2, 4.4, 4.5
- UEK3 (3.8.13-xxx) - Based in Linux Kernel 3.8.13. Available versions: 3.0, 3.1, 3.2, 3.3, 3.4, 3.5, 3.6, 3.7
- UEK2 (2.6.39-xxx) - Based in Linux Kernel 2.6.39. Available versions: 2.0, 2.1, 2.2
- UEK (2.6.32-xxx) - Based in Linux Kernel 2.6.32 LTS. Available versions: N/A

== Oracle OpenStack for Oracle Linux ==
Oracle announced on 24 September 2014 Oracle OpenStack for Oracle Linux. In October 2020, Oracle deprecated support for and ceased releasing OpenStack software.

== See also ==
- Oracle Solaris
- Red Hat Enterprise Linux derivatives
- List of commercial products based on Red Hat Enterprise Linux
