= CentOS Stream =

Linux distribution by The CentOS Project

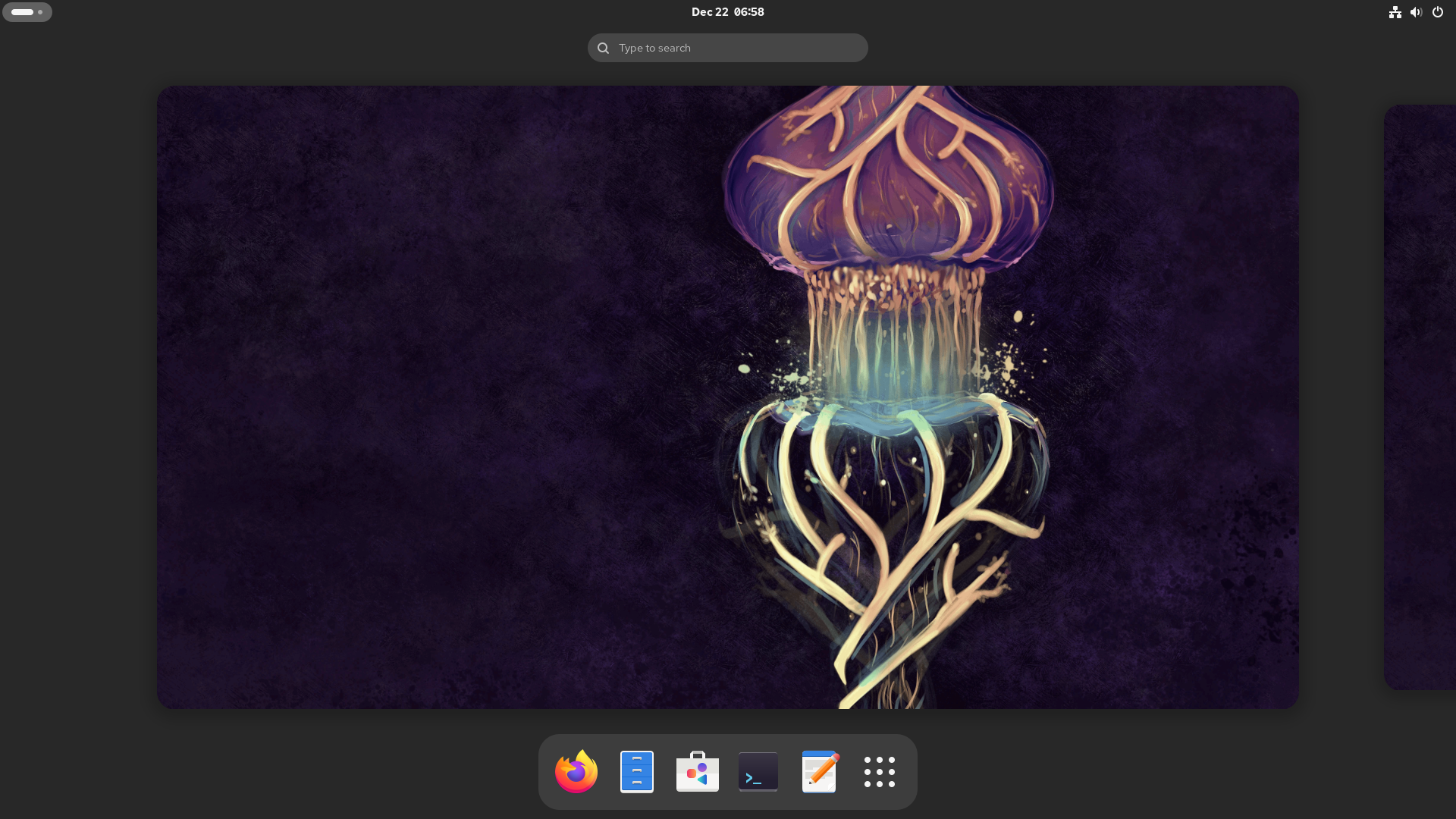
- CentOS Stream 10 showing its desktop environment, GNOME 47.
- Developer: The CentOS Project (affiliated with Red Hat)
- OS family: Linux (Unix-like)
- Working state: Current
- Source model: Open source
- Initial release: 24 September 2019; 7 years ago
- Latest release: 10 / 12 December 2024; 22 months ago
- Repository: gitlab.com/redhat/centos-stream/
- Marketing target: Servers, desktop computers, workstations, supercomputers
- Update method: DNF
- Package manager: RPM
- Supported platforms: x86-64-v2, ARM64, ppc64le, IBM Z
- Kernel type: Monolithic (Linux kernel)
- Default user interface: GNOME Shell, Bash
- License: GNU GPL and other licenses
- Preceded by: CentOS
- Official website: centos.org

CentOS Stream is a community enterprise Linux distribution that exists as a midstream between the upstream development in Fedora Linux and the downstream development for Red Hat Enterprise Linux. CentOS Stream is being used by Meta Platforms (known for Facebook and WhatsApp) and X.

== History ==
The initial release, CentOS Stream 8, was released on 24 September 2019, at the same time as CentOS 8. As CentOS 8 became unsupported, the CentOS Project provided a simple means of converting from CentOS Linux 8 to CentOS Stream 8. On 13 January 2021, the CentOS board approved the creation of Hyperscale SIG proposed by Meta Platforms, Twitter, and Verizon engineers, which focuses on enabling CentOS Stream deployment on large-scale infrastructures and facilitating collaboration on packages and tooling.

CentOS Stream 9 was released on 3 December 2021, with support of IBM Z architecture.

In 2023, Red Hat announced that CentOS 7 and CentOS Stream 8 would be discontinued in 2024 in order to focus on Red Hat Enterprise Linux development. CentOS Stream 9 was given as one possible migration path.

CentOS Stream 10 was released on 12 December 2024.

== Release history ==
Releases of CentOS Stream
Version	Release date	End-Of-Life	Kernel	Architectures
8	2019-09-24	May 31, 2024; 2 years ago	4.18.0	x86-64, ARM64, ppc64le
9	2021-12-03	May 31, 2027; 7 months' time	5.14.0	x86-64-v2, ARM64, ppc64le, s390x
10	2024-12-12	May 31, 2030; 3 years' time	6.12.0	x86-64-v3, ARM64, ppc64le, s390x
Unsupported Supported Latest version
