= Crossbeam Systems =

American technology company

Crossbeam
- Type: Private
- Industry: Network security
- Founded: 1999
- Headquarters: Boxborough, Massachusetts, United States
- Key people: Greg Clark, CEO
- Number of employees: 300+
- Website: crossbeamsystems.com

Crossbeam Systems is headquartered in Boxborough, Massachusetts and has offices in Europe, Latin America and Asia Pacific. Crossbeam Systems was acquired by Blue Coat Systems in December 2012 and the Crossbeam brand has been fully absorbed into Blue Coat.

== History ==
Crossbeam Systems, Inc. was incorporated on November 23, 1999, by Stephen Justus and Mike Akerman, with Throop Wilder joining as a founding team member in 2000. Since the beginning, Crossbeam has been focused on designing and manufacturing a range of network security products.

Peter George led the company from 2001 to June 2007 as CEO and president. Pete Fiore took over the company in 2007 and led the company to growth and profitability until his death in December 2009. In March 2010 and continues today as CEO and president. On November 9, 2012, Crossbeam Systems Inc. was acquired by the private equity firm Thoma Bravo. The company did not publicly disclose the acquisition price or the terms of the deal. On December 17, 2012, Blue Coat Systems announced that it was acquiring Crossbeam Systems. The deal is expected to close December 31, 2012.

== Products ==
The company's main product is its X-Series network security product family, which was introduced in September 2001 as a way for telecommunications operators to consolidate their security server or appliance infrastructure into one chassis, which acts as a virtual security architecture or 'network in a box.' The X-Series architecture consists of five major components including a chassis, an operating system and three types of hardware blades or modules:

Over the past 11-plus years, the X-Series product family, including the modules and operating systems, have gone through six major generational upgrades. In October 2010, the 5th generation upgrade to its X-Series family of network security platforms to include the X20, X30, X60 and X80-S. In October 2011, Crossbeam completed the portfolio with the and added the 6th generation Network Processor Module; the NPM-9610 and NPM-9650. ^{[7]}

As an independent validation of the 6th generation X-Series platform performance, Crossbeam, together with Spirent, European Advanced Network Test Centre] (EANTC) and Heavy Reading set out to create a new real-world methodology for testing network security in the GPRS and 4G-LTE mobile operator network. This methodology was then independently tested by EANTC on the Crossbeam X80-S platform.
