= Marketing communications =

Marketing channels and tools used together

Marketing communications (also known MC, marcom(s), marcomm(s) or just simply communications) refers to the combined use of different marketing channels and tools. Marketing communication channels focus on how businesses communicate a message to their desired market, or the greater market in general. It can also include the internal communications of the organization. Marketing communication tools include advertising, personal selling, direct marketing, sponsorship, communication, public relations, social media, customer journey, and promotion.

MC are made up of the marketing mix which is made up of the 4 Ps (Price, Promotion, Place and Product), for a business selling goods, and made up of 7 Ps: Price, Promotion, Place, Product, People, Physical evidence and Process, for a service-based business.

== Overview ==
Marketing communications include advertising, promotions, product sales, branding, advertising campaigns, events, and online promotions. This process allows the public to become aware of a brand and gain a clear idea of what it has to offer. Brand awareness is the first stage, while brand preference over its competitors is the desired outcome. Due to growing technology and techniques, customers can participate directly. This is achieved by including their ideas and creations in product development and brand promotion. Successful branding involves targeting audiences who appreciate the organization's mission and vision, business values, and marketing program.

Advertising is a small but important part of marketing communications; the marketing communications mix is a set of tools that can be used to deliver a clear and consistent message to target audiences. It is also commonly called the promotional mix. Crosier (1990) states that all terms have the same meaning in the context of the 4Ps: product, price, place, and promotion. Price can send a message to the target audience. For example, when comparing a $50 bag to a $10 bag, the former may be viewed as a luxury or more durable item. The higher goal of advertising is to establish a relationship between the brand and its target market.

The marketing plan identifies key opportunities, threats, weaknesses, and strengths, sets objectives, and develops an action plan to achieve marketing goals. Each section of the 4P's sets its own objective; for instance, the pricing objective might be to increase sales in a certain geographical market by pricing a product or service lower than competitors. This can create a significant change in the market because more people in the target market may choose to do business with your organization, as pricing is one of the most significant aspects of marketing and can influence the whole market positively or negatively.

== Definitions ==
- Communication barriers: Communication barriers are factors that hinder the objectives of marketing communication. Major communication barriers are Noise and clutter, consumer apathy, brand parity, and weak information design, creative ideas, or strategies. Noise is an unrelated sensory stimulus that distracts a consumer from the marketing message (for example, people talking nearby making it hard to hear a radio advertisement). Clutter is the high number and concentration of advertisements presented to a consumer at any time. As attention cannot be divided, there is a limit to how much can be taken in and processed, which means that strong marketing communication needs to stand out from the clutter and be heard above the noise.
  - "Consumer apathy" is the tendency of a consumer to avoid marketing communications. The consumer may not be interested, or consider themselves "in the market," and as such attempt to shut out the irrelevant marketing stimuli; this is known as selective attention. Alternatively, a consumer may be "in the market," yet not be aware of the brand or product's existence or prevalence. Consumers tend to purchase familiar brands, and will not be inspired to investigate alternatives. One approach marketers use to overcome apathy is to create incentives, such as competitive pricing or loyalty rewards.
  - Brand parity means a brand is not significantly different from its competition. Without a distinct value proposition, consumers do not develop brand preference or associations and instead purchase purely based on price. This is not ideal, as effective marketing communication increases brand equity. One important objective of marketing communications is to develop a strong, unique brand identity that allows the brand to be positioned separately from its competition.
- Marketing mix is the most important part of marketing strategy, which is "the framework to manage marketing and incorporate it within a business context".
- Marketing strategy: how a business achieves its marketing objectives. The initial step to achieve a marketing strategy is to identify the market target and build up a business plan.
- Marketing Research does not involve a proven order of steps resulting in an ultimate inference. It is a repeated process that requires a broader outlook. At times, projects may require going in-depth and changing the entire process. Let us take the example of Nokia when they were preparing themselves to compete against the smartphone market. In November 2011, they decided on coming up with something new, especially targeting the youth, who were switching over to the Finnish Smartphones. This switchover required several changes, starting from brand fundamentals to training in-house teams, from targeting to product advancement, and from hiring talented marketing people to new innovations.

== Communications ==
Communication is one important aspect of the marketing mix. Marketing communication is often the largest component of communication within a company, which may be to present company values, objectives or specific products and services to investors, customers or the general public. In the 21st century, communications objectives focus on more customized messages, targeting customer groups or individuals to create high responses and greater brand interaction.

As business becomes increasingly global with greater access to the Internet, mobile phones and social media, new challenges exist to inform people in targeted foreign markets. Shifts in the global economy and access to new markets lead also to greater demands for product shipping and associated services. To be effective, marketing communications must be tailored to its channels. For example: the public relations messaging set is customized to its target audience which is media and the industry, the messaging will be about data proofed achievements, whereas in social media messaging content is more friendly and about the brand's soft qualities. communication strategies must converge with marketing objectives while also accounting for local languages, dialects and cultural norms.

External communications might involve market research questionnaires, an office website, guarantees, company annual reports, and presentations for investors. Internal communications can include marketing materials, price lists, product catalogs, sales presentations, and management communications. On the other hand, each market demands different types of communication. For example, the industrial market demands more personal communication, whereas the consumer market demands non-personal communication.

=== Types of communication ===
There are also 4 different fundamental types of communication.

- One-to-many: this kind of communication is the most original communication. It is "generated from a single broadcast point and then available over airwaves or in mass print runs". This type of communication is usually adapted to news distribution that is not specific, not even interactive. Such as in an urgent notice play over airwave from broadcast in an industry, it is helpful for the general announcement.
- Many-to-one: many-to-one is usually connected to the one-to-many communication. For example, a reply button in your email box, a prepaid number bought from Spark. All the communication techniques proceeded to the public with bi-directional communication from mass communications.
- One-to-one: this is the most intensive and interactive communication at a one-to-one level. There are so many examples like a sales presentation; a negotiation in the market or direct delivery is based on one-to-one communication. Most of this communication is face-to-face. But with the development of the Internet, email and online shopping are taking the chance to be face to face with people. Which provided the chance for sellers and buyers to talk more directly. Another important is instant message 'chat' channels like Wechat and Facebook, which are becoming extremely popular in business.
- Many-to-many: on the background of the highly developed Internet, the many-to-many communication has been growing up such as online chat rooms, 'blogging' websites. The many-to-many communication stands for the participants being able to exchange their ideas and experiences.

One-to-one is more immediate, while the many-to-many channels tend to be less urgent but with greater longevity.

=== Psychology of communication ===
One of the primary goals of marketing communication is to persuade consumers or businesses, by either changing their perception of a brand, product, or service or persuading them to purchase (or feel motivated / tempted to purchase) a product or service. The "Elaboration Likelihood Model" is used to demonstrate how persuasion occurs. When a marketing communication message is sent out, first it must be acknowledged and attended by the receiver. By giving their attention to marketing communication, consumers will begin to process and comprehend the message. There are two routes to persuasion: Central and peripheral. Central route processing is used in high-involvement purchase decisions. These are infrequent, high-risk purchases, usually involving large amounts of money and a significant amount of time (for example, purchasing a house or car). Because these purchase decisions are high risk, a large cognitive effort is expended in order to rationally select the most logical and valuable option available. In these marketing messages, information about the product or service itself is most valuable. Peripheral route processing is employed in low involvement purchase decisions. These are frequent, low-risk purchases, generally of a low or medium cost in which choices are made more on affective (or emotion-based) values rather than cognitive (or rational) values. Because of this, marketing messages will employ more storytelling and imagery, focusing on how the product or service makes one feel, and the associations it has, rather than the attributes and specifications it possesses.

==== Linguistic devices and modes of persuasion ====
A big part of marketing is how companies communicate, whether that be with clients and potential customers or internally with other departments within the business. When companies advertise, they can utilize linguistic devices to persuade the targeted audience; Different devices can produce differing effects. One of the linguistic device categories is a simple language. The different devices under simple language include phonetic symbolism, numbers, sound repetition, and pronunciation. All four devices use the cognitive effort of automatic processing. Phonetic symbolism is "a non-arbitrary relation between sound and meaning, and suggests that the sound of a word can convey meaning apart from its definition". Back vowels and consonants are lower in pitch due to the positioning of the tip of the tongue being further back in the throat. These sounds are associated with heaviness, masculinity, and psychological distance. Conversely, front vowels and consonants are higher in pitch and associated with closeness, femininity, and light. The sound of a brand name can influence the perception of the brand from the consumers' perspective along with product attitude and product recommendations. This being said, when a brand name sound preference is in alignment with the consumers' preference, the perception of the preferred attributes is enhanced.

== Communication process ==
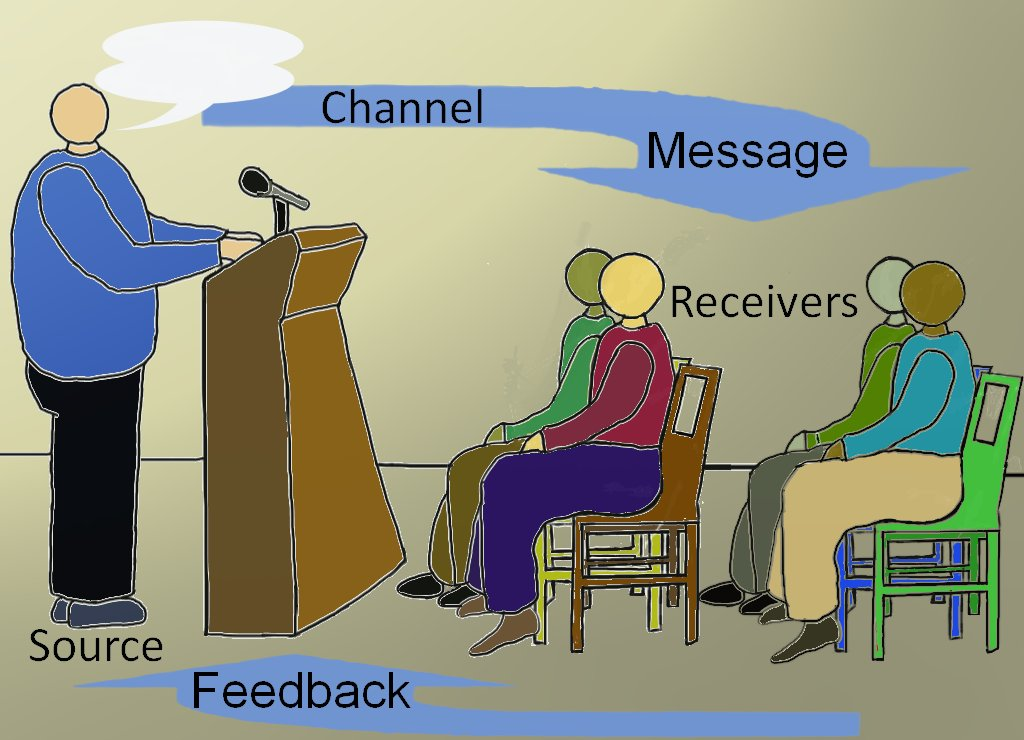
Transactional Model of Communication

Communication can be defined as the process of using, word, sound, or visual cues to supply information to one or more people. A communication process is defined as information that is shared with the intent that the receiver understands the message that the business intended to send. The communication process was once thought of as having the source of the message, which is then encoded, put through the chosen communication channel, which is then decoded by the recipient and then received. Throughout the middle of the channel there is the potential for noise to distort the message being sent. Once the receiver has the message they then give feedback to the original source, where they then find out whether the campaign has been successful or not.

As consumers increasingly use digital channels to research brands, products, and services before purchase, some models of the communication process incorporate an additional channel to reflect this behaviour. Opinion leaders and opinion formers, who can influence consumer perceptions, are also considered within the communication process before the message reaches the recipient.

This model is more effective when there is common ground between the sender and receiver, allowing them to communicate effectively. Choosing the appropriate source helps develop the message and appeal to the target audience. The source will be more effective if it is relatable to the target audience. This realm of understanding is represented by overlapping circles. The more knowledge the source has about the target audience, the better they can understand how the receiver may interpret or react to the message.

The components of the transactional model are:

- Source: The source is an individual or organization that has information to share. The source (or sender) creates and sends the information to another person or group of people. The source may be an individual (e.g. a salesperson or spokesperson) or a non-personal identity (e.g. a corporation or organization). The communication process begins with the source, marketers must carefully choose a source as it affects how the message will be perceived by the target audience.
- Encoding: This is transposing the intended meaning of the message with words, symbols, or pictures to show a message. Encoding is the development of the message that contains the information the source hopes to convey. It is putting together the thoughts, ideas, and information into a symbolic form that can be transmitted and understood by the receiver. Encoding the message is the second step in the communication process. The encoding process leads to the development of a message that contains the information or meaning the source hopes to convey. Encoding is extremely important, it is a brain activity that takes effect when the receiver makes sense of a brand message or idea used to convey meaning: words, color, pictures, signs, symbols, or even music. The message may be verbal or nonverbal, oral or written, or symbolic (e.g. the sound of a brass band being redolent of simpler times or heritage). or it can often include 'cues' such as the Nike 'swoosh' which indicates success. Often things can get in the way of the "correct" encoding and the interpretation of the intended message (decoding). There are methods the sender can use to make sure the receiver interprets the message correctly, these methods include; channels, consumer insights, having similarities with the receiver, and frame of reference (e.g. age, values, culture). Finally, it is extremely important for the sender to get to know its receiver and this is accomplished through research for targeting strategy. These concepts help craft the intended message in the minds of the consumer.
- Message: The message comes from the encoding process, it is the content, meaning, or information the sources hope to convey. The message can be in many forms such as verbal, non-verbal, oral, written, or symbolic.
- Channel: The channel is the method by which the communication travels from the source or sender to the receiver. There are two types of channels, personal and non-personal. Personal channels of communication are direct and target individual groups. Personal communication channels are connected with two or more persons who communicate directly with each other face-to-face, person-to-person through telephone, email, or fax. Social channels also fall under the category of personal communications. Friends, neighbors, associates, co-workers, or family members are all means of social channels. Carrying a message without interpersonal contact between sender and receiver is known as non-personal channels of communication. Mass media or mass communications are examples of non-personal channels since the message is sent to many individuals at one time. Non-personal channels of communication are made up out of two main types, the first being print. Print media includes newspapers, magazines, direct mail, and billboards. The second type is broadcast; broadcast media includes radio and television.
- Decoding: The receiver unravels the symbols to interpret what is being communicated. Transforming the sender's message back into thought. This is influenced greatly by the receiver's frame of reference (or realm of understanding) which involves their values, attitudes and state of mind when receiving the message. For the model to be effective the decoding by the receiver would match the encoding by the source, meaning they correctly understand the message that was sent. Decoding is the process of interpreting messages and relies on correct encoding and the ability of the receiver to deconstruct transmitted meaning. Decoding occurs when the message reaches one or more of the receiver's senses. Consumers both hear and see television ads, others consumers handle (touch) and read (see) an advertising offer (e.g. coupon). According to Belch & Belch this process is deeply influenced by the receiver's frame of reference or field of experience, which refers to the experiences, perceptions, attitudes, and values he or she brings to the communication situation. For effective communication to occur, the message decoding process of the receiver must match the encoding of the sender. Over this entire means the receiver comprehends and correctly translates what the source is trying to communicate. Effective communication is more likely to emerge when there is some common ground between the two parties. The more familiarity the sender has about the receivers, the better the sender can understand their needs, communicate with them, and overall communicate more effectively.
- Receiver: The individual (s) that the source shares thoughts or information with. The receiver hears, sees or reads the message and decodes it.
- Noise: Noise is any external interference during this communication process. Any external factors that create unplanned distortion. This distortion can make it difficult for the receiver to interpret or assign meaning to a message as it was intended by the source. Examples of noise in the encoding of the message could be lack of radio or television signal. Noise can also occur when the sender and receivers fields of experience do not overlap, if there is no common ground between them, which may result in a misunderstanding in the meaning of the message. Throughout the communication process, the message is subject to irrelevant factors that can distort or interfere with its reception. Noise is the physical or Psychological fundamentals either from inside or outside of the process of communication. Noise acts as a barrier as it makes the message less accurate, less productive and unclear. It may even prevent the message from ever reaching the receiver. Physical noise is often triggered by badly made images or messages (e.g. poor print quality) or elements of distraction (e.g. consumer scrolling through TV advertisements). Psychological noise could be mixed meanings, poor credibility of source or the insignificance of the message to the consumer requirements. Not having a connection with the receiver and lacking in common ground usually cause this. This may result in unsuitable encoding of the message such as; using a sign, symbol, or word that is unfamiliar or has a different meaning to the receiver (e.g. sending a message in a foreign language that is not understood by the receiver). The more common ground there is between the sender and the receiver, the less likely it is for noise and barriers to interrupt a message.
- Response/Feedback: The receiver's reaction to the message provides feedback to the sender. This is the set of reactions after seeing, hearing or reading the message. The receiver's response is the feedback and lets the sender know how the message was decoded and received. A form of feedback in an interpersonal selling situation could be questions, comments or any reactions (such as expressions) about the message. In mass media, an indication of how the marketing communications were perceived is the amount of sales after the message has been sent. There are many different ways such as attitude change, store visits and inquiries that provide feedback in mass media. Feedback can help to improve the communication process and the success of future messages. The receiver's particular type of reaction after seeing, hearing, or reading a message is known as a response. Receivers' responses can range from either non-noticeable actions or noticeable actions. Non-noticeable responses can be storing their information in memory and noticeable responses are immediate action such as dialing the commercials number to order a product advertised on television. One of the main goals of communication is receiving appropriate receiver responses, feedback closes the loop in the communications flow and lets the sender monitor how the intended message is being decoded and received. To achieve this goal one can ask indirectly or directly for the response, or assist the receiver in giving the response. Receiving feedback can be more difficult for parties that advertise through the channels of mass media, because advertisers are not in direct contact with their customers so other methods must be obtained to determine how their messages have been received. While the critical form of feedback happens through sales, it is often hard to show a direct relationship between advertising and purchase behavior. So marketers; visit stores, check coupon redemption, use reply cards and listen to customer inquiries to achieve feedback. Once a significant amount of feedback/response study has been gathered advertisers would then have enough information to determine reasons for success or failure in the communication process and from there they can make appropriate adjustments.

=== Opinion leaders and opinion formers ===
Opinion leaders are consumers who have large influence over the purchasing behavior of other consumers. These can be peers or celebrities, and often represent a "desired state" in the eye of the influenced consumer. By following the consumption patterns of opinion leaders, consumers aspire to achieve a similar status or lifestyle, and project a similar image. Because of this, opinion leaders are powerful factors in marketing communications. Having opinion leaders endorse a brand can increase brand awareness and sales. Due to this, large companies pay highly influential celebrities to endorse their products.

You can receive the opinion leaders' thoughts or feelings towards the product/service through paid advertising, social media, blogs, or any other form of written media. These can be direct, or indirect influences.

Opinion formers are consumers who are regarded by their peers as being highly knowledgeable and trustworthy. They are considered experts in selecting the highest quality products due to their extensive knowledge, and as such are able to influence the purchasing behavior of other consumers despite lacking the celebrity status of an opinion leader. They have specialized knowledge about the area which corresponds with the product, service or business. For example, this could be a doctor sponsoring a form of medication, or a personal trainer recommending a sports brand to the customer. This means that both opinion leaders and opinion formers have a large influence on the consumer and their perceived view of the business, product, or service provided. If a brand is specializing in the sale and manufacturing of makeup products, the business would want to look at someone who is both known for their knowledge about makeup and also someone who they know is popular within that community, so that the message is as widespread throughout their target market as possible. Opinion leaders add another link in the communication process, acting as a "meaning filter" for the receivers of the message. The message is sent from the sender and the opinion leaders share their opinions with the targeted audience.

== Mass media ==
=== Television ===
Television has since its inception dominated the advertising media scene, due to its combination of visual and aural stimulation, allowing for greater attention grabbing and more effective transmission of messages than other forms of media. It has a few disadvantages: television commercials suffer from being "zipped" and zapped". "Zipping" is the term given to fast forwarding commercial break sessions during the pre-recording of programs. Often viewers will record programs purely so they can be viewed without the commercial breaks. "Zapping" is the term given to the habit of many consumers to change channels during commercial breaks. This is also done to avoid watching advertisements. Using television advertisements is beneficial due to its wide reach and the degree to which content can be segmented according to the intended target market. Advertisements are carefully paired with time segments and / or linked with appropriate programming, known as "media vehicles". This helps to ensure the intended audience is being reached with the marketing message.

While the initial production costs of a television advertisement are high, it is likely to reach a mass audience and, therefore, maintains a low cost per viewer, making it an efficient communication platform.

=== Radio ===
Radio by definition is the broadcasting of sound programs to the public and today can be live streamed through a broadband connection or digitally transmitted into people's cars or homes. Despite being the oldest form of media transmission still being used, marketing via radio remains a popular and effective choice due to its relatively lower cost and convenience (radio exposure can occur during transit, at work, and during recreational activities). Due to the lack of a visual aspect, radio advertising attempts to create imagery in the consumer's mind. Radio advertising is also extremely effective at reinforcing messages encountered in other channels (such as television). A familiar jingle or voice associated with a brand enhances brand and ad awareness, ultimately increasing brand equity. This is an example of "Integrated Marketing Communications", in which multiple marketing channels are simultaneously utilized to increase the strength and reach of the marketing message. Like television, radio marketing benefits from the ability to select specific time slots and programs (in this case in the form of radio stations and segments within).

Fill et al. argue that radio communication promotes "emotional consumer–centric associations" as each listener is forced to construct a visual representation of the words and sounds such as music in their minds. A common technique used by companies is known as imagery transfer, where a complementary visual television advertisement is used alongside a one-dimensional radio advertisement featuring a similar audio track to stimulate a visual association between the two. Research suggests this sub-conscience relational thought process greatly benefits future brand recognition and awareness.

Radio infomercials are often simple scripts read out by the presenter. This is quick and does not require extensive lead times due to minimal production efforts.

=== Print ===
Printed media is the most basic form of media advertising. It is the most challenging to create strong imagery with, due to its lack of sensory stimulation, but can be effective in efficient, clear information communication and message delivery. Where a consumer may miss a message in video promoted by ads or audio (A loud noise interrupts, or someone blocks their view) in print the message remains visible indefinitely. Aspects such as size, color and style can be used to increase effectiveness relative to other print advertisements, which is important as despite being a basic media communication channel, print is the second largest medium after television.

Within printed media, organizations also produce materials used to inform prospects and to support sales presentations and direct response efforts. Marketing collateral such as business cards, brochures, sales sheets, presentation folders, and point-of-sale materials may use higher-quality paper stocks and tactile or visual finishing treatments to increase perceived quality and reader engagement, and in direct-mail contexts such treatments are intended to help drive response rates.

Traditionally, marketing communications practitioners focused on the creation and execution of printed marketing collateral. Traditional media, or as some refer to as old media, has been used within the marketing and advertising world for many years. Traditional media encompasses conventional forms of advertising media, such as television, magazines, newspapers, radio, and direct mail and outdoor. For many decades, these forms of communication have been the main source for marketers to reach both consumers and other companies. In a world with no internet and the vast world of social media, roots of advertising and promotion lie within traditional media, where there is a more direct, physical way of advertising.

Advertising in the form of print is used by businesses in the form of billboards and posters, as well as magazines and newspapers, to get their message across to the target audience. Businesses will usually place a billboard in areas where it can be easily seen and where the target audience will spend their daily activities. Newspapers, magazines and posters are smaller in size and can be found in numerous places allowing the general public to read them. Depending on the product or service that is being advertised, marketers may specify where the majority of their prints may go to, such as advertisements of a new shampoo promoting more common within salons.

Print media are highly customizable, varying in print size, font, positioning and color combination. Newspapers commonly use coarse paper and tend to have poor reproduction quality, while magazines can enhance the appearance of a certain product due to the heavy weight gloss paper used which translates color well and offers a long lasting quality and likeability. Magazines function as a frame, a psychological device which manipulates perspective and judgement. For example, Vogue, a leading paid circulation fashion magazine, publishes advertising efforts alongside beautiful imagery and elegant photography, the association of the two communicates respectability and sophistication and promotes the credibility of the brands which appear in the same publication. Due to the high-quality reproduction, magazines tend to last longer and are often found in hair salons and waiting rooms. Consumers often cut out individual images which further prolongs the message and increases potential exposure. Although the relevance of the message may be lost during this extended time, brand awareness may still be raised.

Magazines are often segmented by subjects such as women's health, automotive or fashion and therefore effectively reach a particular target market. Newspapers focus on geographical regions which tend to appeal to a broad representative population sample, offering low impact in selectivity. Newspapers are often run on a weekly schedule offering up-to-date information and coverage of local events and businesses as a lower cost alternative to other forms of media. Such advertisements are in smaller typeface and are black and white.

=== Decline ===
Past forms of media are said by many to be gradually losing effectiveness as more contemporary forms become more popular. This change is driven by two key factors: audience fragmentation and ability to choose commercial content. Television, radio, magazines, and newspapers are becoming more fragmented and reaching smaller and more selective audiences. The rapid growth of communication due to interactive messaging, particularly the internet, had caused the changes in the use of communication throughout promotion mediums, with businesses preferring to use modern media over more traditional media methods. Consumers cannot avoid new and innovative ways of communication. Many marketers believe that traditional techniques of advertising have become too expensive and not cost-effective compared to modern ones. Older forms of marketing communications such as TV and newspaper advertising are one way in nature, whereas new media allows marketers to perform a variety of functions.

== Modes of communication and advertisement ==
Communication platforms like Facebook, Twitter, Instagram, TikTok, Snapchat, Skype, or other types of media have become an extremely important means of communication. Although there are other methods of communications that aren't related to social media, people can be hugely influenced by their peers. This process is known as social mediation. Marketing communication platforms personalizes and expends marketing contents in an automated fashion based on the profile of the recipients.

A platform functions as a similar principle in marketing communications, providing awareness and information about a specific brand or product. Strategic selection of various communication platforms is known as a media strategy which aims to engage an audience in a conversation and, as a result, attempt to create a lasting relationship. Modern technology has expanded the use of platforms and ways in which consumers and the brand can interact. As a result, the context of platforms and how they are defined has changed. There are various platforms by which communication is transmitted, and these can be categorized as paid, owned, earned, or shared, formally named as the integrated communication triangle by Grönroos and Lindberg-Repo. The model acknowledges that communication must be credible and trustworthy to be effective. Studies reveal that many consumers look at review forums and ask friends or peers whom they trust for ratings on products before making a purchase decision. Therefore, effective communication relies on an integrated approach of one dimensional and interactive platforms.

Explicitly planned market content is shared through non-personal communication platforms. The brand controls the platform, message content, frequency and repetition of the communication message. These factors are typically accomplished through traditional paid platforms, such as print, electronic, outdoor and alternative media, that aims to target a mass segment of the market.

Other aspects of noise decrease the effectiveness of message penetration. For example, most paid communication platforms, print, and electronic media are filled with marketing and advertising messages and are subject to clutter, often forcing brands to compete for attention. To eliminate noise, brands often choose to include inserts such as samples and scent strips within magazines while newspapers utilize "call to action" inserts such as coupons which encourage consumers to visit or try a local service or good.

=== Social media ===
Social media's market penetration is rising thanks to services like YouTube, Facebook, Instagram, Pinterest, Snapchat and TikTok. Companies are using these external platforms to engage existing and future customers, reinforce brand messaging, influence customer opinions, provide target offers, and serve customers more efficiently. Social media are flexible communication tools that go beyond the traditional means of advertising and allow brands to interact with their audience personally or professionally.

Influencer Marketing used to be focused on applying celebrity endorsement to help to influence audiences. Nowadays, with the growing outreach of social media, "common people" like bloggers are becoming popular and are connected with brands and products as influencers. Companies are beginning to invest time and money creating influence through resonance and reach. Return on Influence is not metrically trackable like Return on Investment is, but mechanisms such as links with UTM parameters can be created to track conversion behavior of influence.

=== The internet ===
The Internet features both non-personal and personal forms of communication. It has become one of the most dominant sources of information for most consumers. Belch & Belch as of 2012 explained that the internet is mostly a non-personal form of communication as consumers absorb information online with no personal contact between the consumer and the organizations that are providing the information on their websites. However, as the internet develops, it is including personal communication as consumers interact with marketers online as well as communicate and share information with one another through the use of social media.

The Internet allows multimedia documents to be shared among its users. As of 2003 approximately 30 million websites have been registered worldwide and 650 million were connected to the Internet. The Internet as a marketing tool can be used to reach and inform customers directly, create brand loyalty, and build relationships. Online advertising includes elements such as: graphic images as website banners, pop-up advertisements, homepage restyling and anchor deals (co-operation between two organizations ).

==== Interactivity ====
Interactivity is a characteristic feature of the Internet that was described in 1996 by John Deighton. He argued that in the then-new Internet business environment, clients rather than the marketers usually start the interaction, by actively looking for the information that they need. Moreover, personal responses of customers will be collected by corporations and their individual demands will be met according to their desires.

On the one hand, traditional media are "push" formats where marketers broadcast their messages to customers, but do not allow direct feedback. The interaction between the two parties is few and far between. On the other hand, Internet media have the attribute of "pull" where customers have the freedom to search for whatever they wish. For instance, whenever a consumer types "flower" Google's search engine, an advertisement of a specific flower shop might be placed on the top or bottom of the search result page by the Google AdWords program. Google makes use of the client's search history and location to place an appropriate ad. The traditional one-way "push" communication is supplanted by the more productive two-way "push and pull" interaction.

==== Individualization ====
Compared with the traditional media where the same information is received by all consumers, As another advantage of two-way interaction, internet media can carry information "tailored" to the needs of a specific consumer. One of the first and most prominent examples is the personalized service provided by Amazon in which consumers are called by their names and "tailored" recommendations are provided according to their previous purchase records. Furthermore, besides "tailored" individual service, with the accumulation of consumers' information on the Internet, mass customization becomes possible in which companies provide "tailored" content to particular segments of consumers with similar interests. Douban is a Chinese social networking service website that allows its users to rate movies, TV dramas, music and concerts. It rapidly grew to 200 million registered users in 2013 (founded in 2005). In addition, people who like the same TV drama, like Game of Thrones, or fans of the same movie star, such as Tom Cruise, will group together to discuss and share their feelings. This allows companies to take advantage of mass customization to sell products or reinforce their brand equity in suitable target groups. By doing so, the interaction and co-operation of companies and consumers are deepening, widening and multiplying in a variety of ways.

==== Industry restructuring ====
Restructuring followed by disintermediation and reintermediation is one of the essential features of the transition from traditional to Internet marketing communications. The Internet may force traditional distributors or retailers out of business simply because Internet transactions are less costly. JD.com significantly impacted the distribution channels for personal computers in China as of 2009 by allowing consumers to order different parts of the computers that were then assembled by the online business, leaving tens of thousands of retailers in that field out of their jobs. In 2015, JD.com accounted for 22.9% of the Chinese online shopping's market share. Again, according to Financial Times, with the shifting trend of using mobile phones for online purchase in China, the people using cellphones to log on to the Internet outnumbered those using PC, the next wave of restructuring faced by JD.com and its major competitors like Alibaba. In 2014, JD.com's orders deriving from mobile phones increased by 543%, compared with the last year's quarter of the same period. Haoyu Shen, the chief executive of the JD.com, ascribed this result to its own company's app rather than the co-operation with Tecent, the Chinese second largest online corporation, although it invested in JD.com in March 2014. As an e-commerce business, JD.com has been constantly facing challenges and opportunities of reintermediation with the rapid shifts of the technology development of the Internet.

=== Email ===
Email marketing is directly marketing a commercial message to a group of people using email. In its broadest sense, every email sent to a potential or current customer could be considered email marketing. It usually involves using email to send ads, request business, or solicit sales or donations, and is meant to build loyalty, trust, or brand awareness. Email marketing can be done to either sold lists or a current customer database. Broadly, the term is usually used to refer to sending email messages with the purpose of enhancing the relationship of a merchant with its current or previous customers, to encourage customer loyalty and repeat business, acquiring new customers or convincing current customers to purchase something immediately, and adding advertisements to email messages sent by other companies to their customers.

=== In-product communication ===
Another channel for direct digital marketing is in-product communication (or in-product marketing), which delivers marketing content directly to a user's internet-connected device or software application. In-product marketing content is often very similar to that of email marketing campaigns, but the segmentation and delivery is more targeted. Because email has become a standard tool in the digital marketing toolkit, the email channel often is overloaded and overused, leading to much lower open rates, lower engagement rates, lower click-through rates (CTR), and lower conversion rates. The rise of internet-connected (IOT) devices is enabling a growing number of consumer products manufacturers to take advantage of this channel of marketing communications, to supplement other digital marketing channels.

== Guerrilla marketing ==
Due to the rise in advertising clutter, there has been a push for non-traditional media such as guerrilla marketing. Guerrilla marketing is usually a low-cost way of generating buzz through creative or unexpected communication platforms. Outdoor settings provide potential ground to gain attention from a large audience. An example is customizing street infrastructure or creating an event such as a flash mob. Research rates guerrilla advertising as having a higher perceived value compared to other communication platforms, which tends to result in a positive consumer response. An example of successful guerrilla marketing was created by Volkswagen (VW) in their promotional "driven by fun" campaign, where consumers could use VW "fast lane" slide instead of the escalator to get to the bottom of the stairs faster.

== Touch points ==
Every point of contact is a form of communication and it is, therefore, necessary to consider touch points as a communication platform. Touch points can be either physical or a human interaction between a brand and the consumer which influence customer decision-making process during pre-purchase, purchase and post-purchase.

There are many ways in which a customer may interact with a business. Interactions occur through direct customer service exchanges, a company website, the point of purchase environment and product packaging or performance. These all contribute to consumer perceptions of a particular brand. For instance, the service-scape of a purchase touch point such as a retail store can influence the perception of quality and service through lighting and layout or other sensory touch points, for example, smell. Fast fashion retailers such as Topshop maintain a white store interior and exterior which is perceived as luxurious. Likewise, the higher price point and packaging of Ferrero Rocher may communicate sophistication and better quality. Visual appearance can have a significant effect on purchase decision, companies such as Coke a Cola and Pepsi provide a free fridge to distributors to control how products are displayed at the point of purchase.

== Multiplier effect ==
While boarding a United Airlines flight, Dave Carroll saw baggage handlers on the tarmac damage his Taylor guitar. After failed attempts to solve the issue through customer service, Carroll uploaded a humorous YouTube video titled "United breaks guitars", which experienced over 15 million views. Carroll's YouTube video is an example of the multiplier effect, and how consumer experiences are shared through user-generated content (UGC) networks and word of mouth communication. Research shows customers are more likely to pass on negative experiences, and therefore, such interactive platforms have a significant impact on purchase decisions and brand outlook.

This highlights a trend in integration of consumer behavior with marketing communications, where technology has facilitated social group communication. Communication has changed from one direction with companies in control of their message to a dialogue where businesses interact with consumer feedback. As Andy Lark, Commonwealth Bank CMO states "the power has shifted, we are now entering a transparent age where there are no secrets".

Traditional models viewed paid media platforms as the primary source of information. However, technology has enabled dialogue within a consumer-centric communication platform. This flow of information allows a many-to-many exchange through UGC, which includes all types of creative content online through blogs, chats, forums, online platforms for product reviews and social media websites such as Facebook, YouTube and Instagram, which are known as earned and shared media.

=== Co-creation ===
Co-creation takes place when customers not only buy the company's products but also help in designing and developing them. Nike built an example of co-creation and customer empowerment through earned and shared media. Nike ID is an online application that allows customers to design their shoe and therefore "Just do it online". Market-generated media remain an important communication platform and information source. Consumers tend to consider both market-generated and UGC when making a purchase decision, particularly, for higher involvement product like vinyl record albums. The transition from traditional media to various forms of online and UGC marketing is increasing. Academics recognize that marketing communication is an open system and customers are influenced by multiple communication platforms. Ultimately positive brand encounters manifest brand supporters who contribute to positive earned and shared media, through product recommendations online and offline.

=== Direct marketing ===
In direct marketing the producer communicates directly with potential customers, instead of through third-party media. Individual customer's responses and transactions are recorded. Direct marketing is a growing form of marketing communication. It is designed to build the relationship between the customer and the brand, known as customer relationship management (CRM). Organizations use customer accounts in order to monitor and understand their needs. They manage detailed information about the customer's touch points with the objective to maximize satisfaction and loyalty. The communication can be in person, by telephone, mail, email or website. The interaction between the organization and the customer is usually a two-way communication. Direct marketing relies on CRM databases that contain valuable customer information. Good quality databases can provide a competitive advantage and increase profitability. Treating the customer database as an expense rather than an investment, or not continuously maintaining or updating them can be detrimental.

=== Direct mail ===
Direct mail is a letter, card, catalog, or sample sent through post, email, fax, or courier. This communication is most effective when the recipient has shown interest in or has previously purchased from the organization. Advantages of direct mail are personalization, careful targeting, creativity and flexibility. Email is low-cost, but can be lost through spam and junk email filters. Direct mail is dependent on accurate databases.

=== Telemarketing ===
Telemarketing is marketing communication via telephone. There are two types of telemarketing: outbound and inbound. Outbound telemarketing is used by organizations to reach out to potential customers, generate sales, make appointments with salespeople and introduce new products. Inbound telemarketing is where people call the organization to complain or inquire about products. Both outbound and inbound can be used as a customer service strategy to boost sales and receive suggestions for improvement. Advantages of telemarketing include targeted communications, flexible and direct interaction between the organization and the customer, it can be an effective personal selling partner and it is cost-effective compared to face-to-face contact. A disadvantage is that call centers are usually used to handle outbound and inbound telemarketing, which need to be implemented, managed and financed.

=== Mail order ===
Mail order marketing is a catalog of products that customers can order to receive in the mail. This form of direct marketing dates back over 100 years. Home shopping, online shopping and teleshopping now accompany it. With current technology mail order has improved. Now there can be a larger range in catalog, delivery is faster, and complaints are dealt with professionally. Mail order exerts less pressure on the customer than telemarketing and sales are easy to manage, however costly infrastructure is required in maintaining the back-end.

=== Direct-response advertising ===
Direct-response advertising is partially direct marketing. It is a message transmitted through traditional communications media that requires the reader, viewer, listener or customer to respond directly to the organization. The audience may respond to receive more information or to purchase a product. A common example of direct response advertising is in television "home shopping immediately to receive a particular deal or discount. Disadvantages are that focus can be lost because of the medium of communication and the targeting can be less narrow compared to direct mail. Organizational messages can get cluttered and crowded.

==== Cellular marketing ====
Cellular marketing uses the audience's mobile phone and SMS to promote a product or brand. Advantages are a high level of flexibility and easy integration through computer systems using the Internet to send mass text messages. This marketing communications platform allows organizations to directly target customers to remind them to renew subscriptions, give exclusive product discounts, or build brand reputation through competitions or sweepstakes. The disadvantage is that some customers are charged to receive SMS, so opt-in permission is required.

==== CD/DVD technology ====
CD and DVD discs can be used as part of e-communications. Entire marketing presentations, catalogs, brochures and price lists can be stored on a CD. CDs are small and simple to hand out to target audiences and most modern computers have CD drive readers, however, most of the same information can be presented on a website or email.

== Integrated marketing communications ==
Integrated marketing communications (IMC) is the use of marketing strategies to optimize the communication of a consistent message of the company's brands to stakeholders. Coupling methods together improves communication as it harnesses the benefits of each channel, which when combined, builds a clearer and vaster impact than if used individually. IMC requires marketers to identify the boundaries around the promotional mix elements and to consider the effectiveness of the campaign's message.

In the mid to late 1980s, the marketing environment was undergoing profound environmental changes with implications for marketing communications. Media proliferation, audience fragmentation, globalization of markets, the advent of new communications technologies, the widespread use of databases meant that the old methods, and practices used in mass marketing were no longer relevant. In particular, the rise of digital and interactive media meant that marketers were relying less on advertising as the dominant form of marketing communications. Amongst practitioners and scholars, there was an increasing recognition that new approaches to marketing communications were required. That new approach would become known as integrated marketing communications. A number of empirical studies, carried out in the early 1990s, found that the new IMC was far from a "short-lived managerial fad," but rather was a very clear reaction by advertisers and marketers to the changing external environment.

Integrated marketing communications is a holistic planning process that focuses on integrating messages across communications disciplines, creative executions, media, timing and stakeholders. An integrated approach has emerged as the dominant approach used by companies to plan and execute their marketing communication programs and has been described as a paradigm shift.

IMC unifies and coordinates an organization's marketing communications to promote a consistent brand message. Coordinating a brand's communications makes the brand seem more trustworthy and sound, as it is seen as a 'whole' rather than a mixture of different messages being sent out. The IMC perspective looks at the 'big picture' in marketing, advertising and promotions.

=== History ===
The impetus to rethink marketing communications came from a number of environmental changes that were becoming increasingly apparent throughout the mid to late 1980s. Media was proliferating and at the same time converging, audiences were fragmenting and many new communications disciplines were emerging. Few advertising agencies provided the full suite of services in terms of the varied communications disciplines. Companies were reliant on a multiplicity of service providers for assistance with advertising, public-relations, branding, packaging, sales promotion, event organizers and other promotional activities. Each of these communications disciplines was treated as a "silo"; with little thought to the synergies between them, with the result that many different stakeholders involved in presenting the company's external image throughout the breadth and length of a campaign. In that environment, both practitioners and theorists recognized the potential for confusing or inconsistent brand images to develop across media and across different communications disciplines. The fragmentation of audiences presented marketers with particular challenges. No longer were they able to communicate with mass markets via mass media; instead they needed to communicate with increasingly tightly defined market segments, using highly specialist media and communications disciplines. New media and the use of databases were enabling marketers to communicate with customers on a one-to-one basis. The old methods and practices associated with mass communications were failing to serve the realities of the new era. The imperative to present a clear, coherent and unified narrative in both internal and external communications was becoming increasingly apparent by the late 1980s.

In 1989, two discrete events served to draw attention to the fact that industry attitudes to marketing communications were shifting. Firstly, the consulting firm, Shearson-Lehman Hutton published a report on the subject of consumer advertising, signaling that a number of market-place changes would force packaged goods marketers to adopt a more integrated approach to marketing communications. Their report also noted that high-end manufacturers (e.g. automobiles) and up-market services (e.g. cruise vacations) were more inclined to use integrated promotions. Secondly, the American Association of Advertising Agencies (4A's), instituted a task-force to investigate integrated marketing communications (IMC), with the result that the first official definition was published. The AAAA defined IMC as, "a concept of marketing communications planning that recognizes the added value of a comprehensive plan that evaluates the strategic roles of a variety of communication disciplines (e.g. general advertising, direct response, sales promotion, and public relations) and combines these disciplines to provide clarity, consistency, and maximum communication impact." At this stage, the development of IMC, focused primarily on the need for organizations to offer more than just standard advertising and to integrate the various communications disciplines. The 4As originally coined the term the "new advertising"; however, this title did not appropriately incorporate many other aspects included in the term "IMC" – most notably, those beyond traditional advertising process aside from simply advertising.

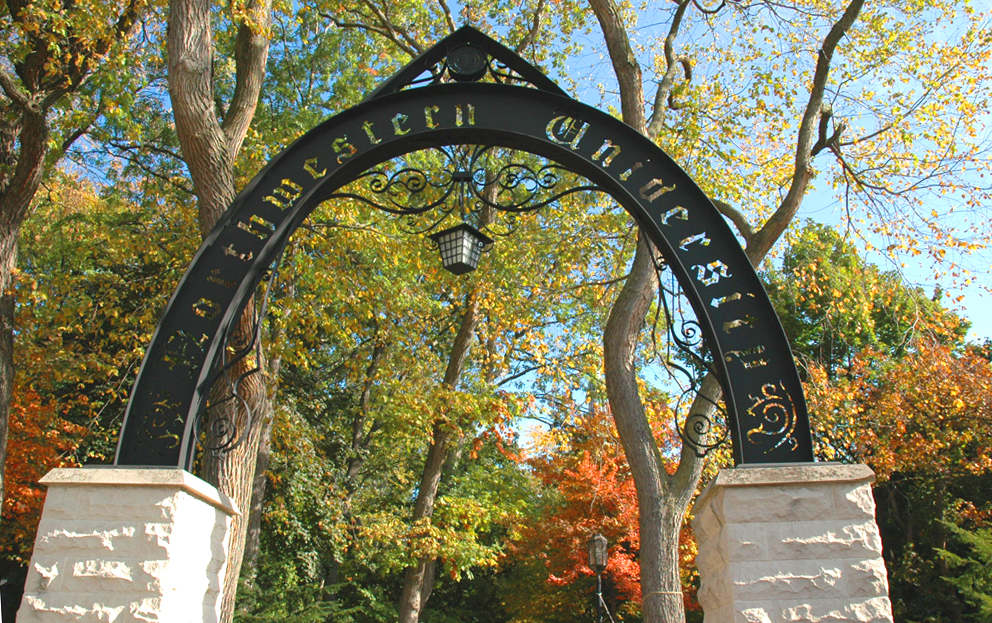
The Medill School at Northwestern was the first university to teach course in integrated marketing communications.

In 1991, the faculty of Medill School of Journalism, Northwestern University in conjunction with the AAAA, began the first empirical research study designed to investigate how IMC was being used. The study focused around understanding the concept and the importance of IMC and also to analyze the extent in which IMC was practiced in all major U.S advertising agencies. This initial study was then replicated by other studies with a view to examining how IMC was being used in other countries; New Zealand, UK, US, Australia, India, Thailand, South Africa and the Philippines, etc. The findings from these studies demonstrated that the new IMC was far from a "short-lived managerial fad" but rather was "a very clear reaction by advertising agencies and their clients as they are affected by a multitude of factors such as new forms of information technology including development and usage of databases, media fragmentation, client desires for interaction/synergy, and global and regional coordination." This was the second stage of IMC's development, where the focus shifted to documenting the practice of IMC as a global phenomenon. In other words, researchers were attempting to codify practices that had been used for some time.

In 1993, Don Schultz and his team published the first text-book dedicated to IMC. Their work, simply entitled, Integrated Marketing Communications, described IMC as a totally new way of looking at the whole of marketing communications, rather than looking at each of the parts separately. And, in the same year, the Medill School at Northwestern University changed their curriculum to include a focus on this new idea of integrated marketing communications rather than the traditional program which had emphasized advertising. IMC emerged from an "academic department that, for several decades, had been recognized as the number one advertising program. Since the mid-1990s, virtually every text-book on the subject of marketing communications has adopted an integrated perspective or has added chapters on IMC in new editions of standard works. Collectively these books focus on the IMC planning processes and this represents the third distinct stage in the evolution of IMC – an emphasis on managing and organizing IMC.

Over time, scholars have advanced different definitions of IMC, with each definition exhibiting a slightly different emphasis. Yet, in spite of the variety of definitions in circulation, there is general consensus that integrated marketing communications should be viewed as a planning process. Some scholars have pointed out that because IMC is both a process and a concept, it is exceedingly difficult to define.

Some of the key definitions that have been advanced during IMC's evolution are outlined here:

- "IMC is the process of all sources and information managed so a consumer or prospect is exposed which behaviorally moves the customer more towards a sale."
- "The strategic coordination of all messages and media used by an organization to influence its perceived brand value."
- "The process of strategically controlling or influencing all messages and encoring purposeful dialogue to created and nourish profitable relationships with consumers and other stakeholders."
- "[A three-pronged definition] One-voice marketing communications is integration that creates a clear and consistent image, position, message, and/or theme across all marketing communication disciplines or tools. Integrated communications refers to the creation of both a brand image and a behavioral response that emanate directly from marketing communications materials such as advertisements. Coordinated marketing communications associates 'integrated' with the concept of 'coordination'.
- "IMC is a strategic business process used to plan, develop, execute and evaluate coordinate measurable persuasive brand communication programs over time with consumers, customers and prospects, and other that are targeted, relevant internal and external audiences."
- "IMC is the concept and process of strategically managing audience-focused, channel-centered, and results-driven brand communication programs over time."
- "An IMC program plans and executes various marketing activities with consistency so that its total impact exceeds the sum of each activity. It is a strategy in which different communication tools like advertising, public relations, sales promotion, direct marketing and personal selling work together to maximize the communication impact on target consumers." (Saeed et al., 2013)
- "IMC is the planning and execution of all types of advertising-like and promotion-like messages selected for a brand, service, or company, in order to meet a common set of communication objectives, or more particularly, to support a single ‘ positioning’."

Today, there is general agreement amongst both practitioners and scholars that the emergence of IMC represents "a significant example of development in the marketing discipline... [that] has influenced thinking and acting among all types of companies and organizations facing the realities of competition in an open economy." Belch and Belch argue that IMC has become the dominant approach used by companies to plan and execute their marketing communication programs while other scholars have described IMC as a paradigm shift. Larry Percy argues that "the planning and execution of all marketing communication should be integrated".

=== Meaning of integration ===
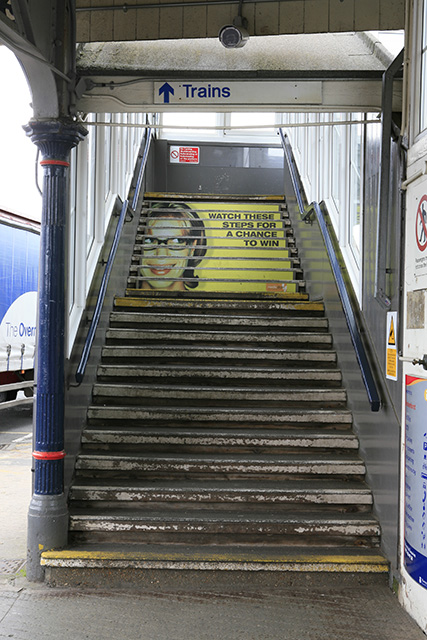
Integrating the creative and the media can result in imaginative and powerful messages that grab attention and are noticed.

Within the literature there is no absolute agreement about the meaning of "integration" in the concept, "integrated marketing communications". The concept of IMC has evolved during its brief history, and with that different ideas around the meaning of integration have been advanced. The diverse views surrounding IMC and its meaning can be explained by the early state of theoretical development and research on IMC which gives rise to a multiplicity of different perspectives. As the discipline matures, these different views are expected to converge.

The marketing and advertising literature identifies many different types of integration:

==== Functional integration ====
Functional integration refers to the capacity of the different promotional tools to complement each other and deliver a unified, coherent message. Each of the communications disciplines (advertising, PR, personal selling, sales promotion etc.) has its own strengths and weaknesses. For instance, it is generally recognised that straight advertising is very effective at creating brand awareness, but much less effective at converting awareness into actual sales. As consumers approach the actual purchase, they may turn to other types of promotion such as personal selling or direct marketing. A carefully planned communications program will include a blend of tools in a way that the messages move the customer through the various stages of the purchase decision – from need recognition through to purchase and post-purchase stages. Integrating the communications disciplines addresses the question of how the strengths of one discipline can be used to overcome the weaknesses of a different discipline.

==== Message integration ====
Message integration is also known as image integration or creative integration. A key task for IMC is ensuring consistency in executions within and across the different types of marketing communications, as well as over time. Everything connected with an IMC campaign should have a similar 'look and feel', irrespective of the medium or tool. Message integration does not imply that messages need to be identical. Rather it means that every piece of promotion – from advertising to direct mail to collateral materials to packaging to posters to corporate vehicles to business cards and office stationery – should be immediately recognizable as part of the same livery.

Clearly, media releases which are often part of a PR program are very different to persuasive messages used in advertising. However, messages should include a similar tone and at least some common elements so that each message looks like it is part of a coherent, integrated campaign. Every execution is part of the brand's identity. Consistent executions facilitate brand awareness. People associate the 'look' of the brand's marketing communication with the brand itself. Consistent executions are more of a 'feeling' that ties everything together; a unique look or feel so that the target audience recognizes a brand's marketing communication even before they see the brand name. The key to consistency is the visual feel. This is because the visual memory for the imagery associated with the brand actually elicits faster brand identification than the brand name itself.

==== Media integration ====
Much IMC planning is concerned with coordinating different media channels to optimize the effectiveness of marketing communications programs. If brand communications "reflect implied brand values and imagery that are consistent throughout differing media channels, then clearly these channels act in a mutually reinforcing way with each successive consumer engagement." Certain messages may not translate into other media. For instance, messages containing 'sex appeals' may work well on TV because movement lends itself to eroticism, but may become "flat" in a static medium such as print. In such cases it is important that the secondary media support the primary media and that messages harmonize.

Research studies suggest that consumers learn more quickly when exposed to messages via different media. The explanation for this is that slight variations in execution create a slight mental perturbation which grabs attention, and results in more elaborate encoding of the main message argument. By exposing consumers to the same message through multiple media, there are more opportunities to engage with consumers. In short, a multimedia strategy is more effective.

==== Integration of timing ====
Integration of timing refers to the timing messages so that they operate to support each other and reach potential customers at different junctures, depending on when they are most receptive to different types of message or depending on the consumer's readiness to buy.

==== Other types of integration ====
Other types of integration include:

Coordinated integration refers to the ways that different internal and external agencies (e.g. web designers, advertising agencies, PR consultants, graphic designers) coordinate to provide a consistent message.
Stakeholder integration refers to the way that all stakeholders (e.g. employees, suppliers, customers and others) cooperate to communicate a shared understanding of the company's key messages and values.
Relationship integration refers to the way that communications professionals (e.g. marketing managers, advertising managers) contribute to the company's overall corporate goals and quality management.

=== Criticisms ===
Both practitioners and scholars agree that IMC makes practical "good sense". Consequently, the discipline has relatively few critics. Nevertheless, researchers have pointed to areas that are in need of further research, and highlight some of the discipline's deficiencies:

- Some practitioners and scholars argue that IMC is not new. Skeptics point out that the more experienced communications managers, especially national brand managers, have always practiced integration.
- A more serious criticism of IMC concerns the problem of measurement. The value of IMC activities has proved very difficult to measure due to the interactions of different communications tools. A growing number of scholars agree that the lack of rigorous measurement metrics and methods represents a major challenge for the discipline.
- Studies have shown that, while managers are familiar with the IMC concept in theory, it is not widely practiced. Such findings suggest that IMC is easy to understand, but difficult to do. One possible explanation for the slow uptake is that organizational barriers to implementation may have become entrenched and are difficult to overcome. A number of organizational characteristics have been cited as possible barriers to implementation. These factors include: a mind-set that has been built up over the years which promotes specialization rather than integration; organizational structure which has been designed to manage specialisms (e.g. advertising, PR as separate branches); manager ability and lack of skills in integration; agency remuneration systems and the adequacy of budgets.

=== Marketing communications framework ===
The marketing communications planning framework (MCPF) is a model for the creation of an ICM plan. Created by Chris Fill, senior examiner for the Chartered Institute of Marketing, the MCPF is intended to solve the inadequacies of other frameworks.

=== Integrated marketing communications planning approaches ===
==== Inside–out approach ====
An “inside-out” approach is the traditional planning approach to marketing communication. Planning begins "inside" the organization by identifying the goals and objectives which are often based around what has always been done. Communication's task then becomes a process of "selling" the organization's message to the "outside" or external stakeholders.

The inside–out approach to integrated marketing communications has been criticized as a one sided view point, since it combines the elements of communication and marketing to create a single unified message. Porcu and his team point out that many of the first, tentative attempts to practice IMC were primarily concerned with integrating the message, so that the organization appeared to speak with "one voice," but failed to adopt a more rounded customer orientation. The inside–out approach is weak due to the stagnant, outdated method.

==== Outside–in approach ====
The outside–in approach of integrated marketing communications seeks to understand the needs and wants of the consumer. In addition to the previous category, this approach establishes significant progression. Organizations can gain in-depth knowledge based on consumers and therefore can accommodate the way they approach to fulfill their requirements. Relationship marketing aids in building up a history of frequent conversation between organizations and stakeholders which contributes to trust. Communication builds rapport that could prove to be profitable as they retain clientele. The outside-in approach offers a unique way to plan, as it operates backwards by concentrating on customers first, then determining the most effective course of marketing and communication methods to implement. Effectively managing the strategic business process is crucial as it defines the steps to follow which ensure brand value is upheld.

==== Cross-functional planning approach ====
Cross-functional planning approach of integrated marketing communications diverges away from the other two categories, it does not center around the concept of marketing promotional elements, instead the focus has shifted toward restructuring the organization to increase a customer-centric environment. This approach recognizes that messages do not just come from the marketing department, but can come from virtually any department within the organization. Investing for the reorganization sparks change where all departments interconnect to work cohesively toward managing and planning all stages of brand relationship. As a unified organization, the cross-functional process is a competitive advantage as they can achieve profitable relationships with customers and stakeholders. This can be achieved through improving the relation amongst messages sent from all departments through channels to the receivers. By sending strategic messages and monitoring any external reaction, organizations gain feedback data from consumers which can be used to inform subsequent planning or fine-tuning of the communications strategy. The process is circular, not linear, at the beginning organization and consumer communicate by interacting and dialogue which ignites the relationship, over time trust is earned and the consumer may continue to purchase, which in turn increases sales and profitability for the organization and finally, the relationship is strong and the organization retains clientele. Interactive communication is advantageous for a cross-functional approach as the business and consumer are both involved in brand communication. Implementing IMC is a flexible process due to the changing nature of the marketing dynamics therefore by eliminating borders within the organization it allows for this notion.

=== Barriers to implementation ===
The barriers to implementation have been cited as one of the main reasons for the failure to adopt holistic approaches to IMC. The key barriers cited in the literature are:

No support from senior management

It is vital for an organization who implements integrated marketing communications to have the commitment from all levels of employees, including senior management. The union between both marketing and corporate goals should coincide and support simultaneously. The lack of involvement from senior management could lead to IMC being deprived of resources which prevent the full potential IMC can deliver for the organization to benefit from. Higher levels of the business need to coincide with the efforts of staff in the strategic planning to grasp that IMC's program is valuable.

Clients are confused about the concept

Some companies such as advertising agencies could possibly take advantage of the integrated marketing communications model, due to the stress they receive from clients and budgets being reduced. The introduction of new technology broadens the boundaries for advertising elements to endeavor with such avenues like the internet. Their focus may stray from the core principles of IMC which is to integrate the elements together, as they're less effective individually. Also, their clients may not grasp the IMC concept as an essential attribute, therefore, they perceive IMC as saving money due to the strategic juxtaposition.

Organization is too specialized

One of the core fundamentals of integrated marketing communications is that the focus aspires toward a customer orientation. In spite of that, the purpose of some organizations have not adopted the framework and are still task orientated. Examples include public relations, direct marketing and advertising.

Conflict within organization

Trying to implement integrated marketing communications into strong hierarchy structured organizations may cause staff resistance due to the nature of horizontal communication causing disagreements amongst staff. Staff may not perform their tasks and functions which jeopardizes the work environment. For IMC to be successful the culture of the organization needs to accommodate an open perspective where communication amongst the varying departments are managed tactically. Individuals reactions toward the new restructure will differ, as some become custom to the process and enjoy the borderless integration, on the other hand, some may feel threatened from the absence of control that once maintained order and power within the previous structured organization (Vladmir, Miroslav, & Papic, 2012). A corporate structure may not necessarily invite IMC due to their culture being incompatible for the integration.

==== Removing barriers ====
Integrated marketing communication is the process of communicating an idea in order to attract customers using an array of tools. It is the process of sending out a message to a receiver (Communications, 2016). Depending on the company values and the type of product or service they offer, the most appropriate message to deliver will depend on the brand and consumer. To understand how integrated marketing communication can benefit a business, three main areas will be discussed. These areas being who the Sender is? Who is the Receiver? And what tools can the sender use in order to pass a message on to the receiver?

Practical solutions towards improving marketing strategies by using ICM can be done through two differing marketing concepts: the four P's or the four C's. Also, the uses of encoding and decoding should be followed, all of which intertwine to form growth in sales financially for a business.

== 4C's ==
Originally, marketing was focused around the 4P's (product, price, place and promotion) which concentrated on companies' internal concepts. The idea of integrated marketing communications was first raised in 1993 by Don E. Schultz, who changed the 4P's concept into the 4C's model. The four parts include consumer, communication, convenience and cost, taking into consideration the needs and wants of consumers. Integrated marketing communications accomplished synergy when each element was executed in accordance with the overall vision of the organization's campaign, which allows the message to be executed efficiently. Finding out who the target market is to answer the 4C's: knowing what products they're willing to purchase, the amount of money they are willing to spend for it, how the product will fulfil their needs and wants, the accessibility of the product and how easily correct information is transmitted. Changing the emphasis on what consumers desire leads to a higher success being attained through IMC, as it is being influenced by not only internal stakeholders but also external ones.

== Communication-based relationship marketing ==
Expanding from this, Tom Duncan and Sandra E. Moriarty formed the concept of communication-based relationship marketing. This model diverged from the concept of the general one way, business influencing consumers what to believe scenario. However, Duncan and Moriarty argued that communication between business and consumers was the key to developing a strong establishment for consumer oriented marketing endeavors. The process of IMC through communication-based marketing goes through a sequential three stage process. Organizations begin with choosing an effective mixture of communication methods; then, the marketing methods are selected; thereafter, the best of each element is fused and integrated together which thence is channeled from the organization to the audience. Subsequently, these findings shaped modern marketing, focusing on an interactive two-way approach that builds rapport with stakeholders. Developments from integrated marketing communications have evolved into three categories: inside-out approach, outside-in approach and cross-functional strategic approach.

== Branding ==
Branding goes beyond having a logo; it is how businesses communicate on behalf of their company, verbally and visually. A brand is a conversation — it is how people talk about your company when you are not in the room. Consumers are constantly interacting and meeting with brands. This can be through television or other media advertisements such as event sponsorships, personal selling and product packaging. Brand exposure such as this is known as a brand touch point or brand contact whereby the organization can try impressing its consumer. Without branding, consumers wouldn't be able to decipher between products and decide which one they like most. People may not be able to even tell the differences between some of the brands, they would have to try each brand several times before being able to judge which one was best. In order to help with purchase decisions, marketing communications try to create a distinct image for the brand. Brand associations are made to encourage linkages with places, personalities or even emotions which creates a sophisticated brand personality in the minds of the consumers. This shows how brand communications add value to products and why branding is a crucial aspect to the communication platform.

=== Consumer–brand relationship constructs ===
To build brand loyalty is to build a trusting relationship with a brand so strong that you will repeatedly buy from them due to an emotional commitment to the brand. There are many CBR constructs but five of the main ones in the literature are brand love, brand attachment, self-brand connection, brand identification, and brand trust. All five of these constructs are not exclusive and firm, but can overlap each other. Brand attachment is the emotional connection a customer has with a brand. Brand love is the measurement of that emotional commitment to a specific brand from a satisfied customer. Self-brand connection is the degree to which a brand has become an important aspect of one's self-identity. In other words, this brand accurately represents their self-concept. Over the years, researchers argue that self-brand connection is the most important of all the CBR constructs. Brand identification is the consumer's perceived unity and oneness with the brand. Lastly, brand trust is the consumers perceived feelings of safety and assurance in the brand's products and company.

== Focus ==
Marketing communications are focused on the product/service as opposed to corporate communications where the focus of communications work is the company/enterprise itself. Marketing communications are primarily concerned with demand generation and product/service positioning while corporate communications deal with issue management, mergers and acquisitions, litigation, etc.

== Customer-focused versus customer-centric ==
A recent discovery in integrated marketing communication is the change in the role of the customer within the business world. Due to the fast-paced growth of technology, customers are rapidly gaining more power through forums such as word of mouth; now with capabilities of reaching a much wider audience through the use of social medias, organizations have begun to re-evaluate their typical marketing strategies and customer approaches from the traditional customer-focused attitude to the wide-spreading customer-centric method in order to develop a more integrated strategy.

A customer-focused approach can be defined as "when an organization learns more about the habits of the customer so that they can identify opportunities for cross-selling". While this type of approach can be viewed as entirely satisfactory, Kliatchko (2008) introduced a contrasting concept which concentrates on "working from the outside in" and promotes a different perspective on organizations. When an organization adopts a customer-centric technique, they forgo the view that customers are only passive receivers of marketing techniques and focus on listening to what their needs are and striving to satisfy them; integrating the customer into the process. Many organizations are yet to relinquish such control, as shown by research conducted by Campaign magazine, which can only be suspected to be due to the fear that it could potentially diminish the marketing profession.

== See also ==
- Advertising – emphasizes historical and social aspects of advertising
- Advertising management – focuses on practical managerial approach to advertising
- Brand awareness
- Consumer behaviour
- Marketing activation
- Marketing mix
- Media intelligence
- Media relations
- Promotional mix
- Real-time marketing
- Mobile marketing
- Strategic communication

== Cited sources ==
- Ang, Lawrence (2014). Principles of Integrated Marketing Communications. Cambridge University Press. ISBN 978-1107649187.
- Kliatchko, Jerry (2005). "Towards a new definition of Integrated Marketing Communications (IMC)". International Journal of Advertising. 24: 7–34. doi:10.1080/02650487.2005.11072902. S2CID 166562530.
- Kliatchko, Jerry (2008). "Revisiting the IMC construct". International Journal of Advertising. 27: 133–160. doi:10.1080/02650487.2008.11073043. S2CID 44570427.
- Percy, L. (2008). Strategic Integrated Marketing Communications. Oxford: Butterworth-Heinemann. ISBN 9780415822091.
