= Trade name =

Name that a business trades under for commercial purposes

A trade name, also known as a trading name, business name or operating name, is a pseudonym used by companies and other organizations that do not operate under their registered legal name. Registering the trade name with a relevant government body is often required.

In a number of countries, the phrase "trading as" (abbreviated to t/a) is used to designate a trade name. In the United States, the phrase "doing business as" (abbreviated to DBA, dba, d.b.a., or d/b/a) is used, among others, such as assumed business name or fictitious business name. In Canada, "operating as" (abbreviated to o/a) and "trading as" are used, although "doing business as" is also sometimes used.

A company typically uses a trade name to conduct business using a simpler name rather than its formal and often lengthier name. Trade names are also used when a preferred name cannot be registered, often because it may already be registered or is too similar to a name that is already registered.

Online platforms such as Wix, Namelix, Looka, LegalZoom, and Elementor also provide tools for creating and searching for trade names as part of establishing a business website.

== Legal aspects ==
Using one or more fictitious business names does not create additional separate legal entities. The distinction between a registered legal name and a fictitious business name, or trade name, is important because fictitious business names do not always identify the entity that is legally responsible.

Legal agreements (such as contracts) are normally made using the registered legal name of the business. If a corporation fails to consistently adhere to such important legal formalities like using its registered legal name in contracts, it may be subject to piercing of the corporate veil.

In English, trade names are generally treated as proper nouns.

== By country ==
=== Argentina ===
In Argentina, a trade name is known as a nombre de fantasía ('fantasy' or 'fiction' name), and the legal name of business is called a razón social (social name).

=== Australia ===
In Australia, businesses are required to register any business name that they operate under. The Australian Securities and Investments Commission manages the registration and approval of business names, which are linked to Australian Business Number records.

=== Brazil ===
In Brazil, a trade name is known as a nome fantasia ('fantasy' or 'fiction' name), and the legal name of the business is called razão social (social name).

=== Canada ===
In some Canadian jurisdictions, such as Ontario, when a businessperson writes a trade name on a contract, invoice, or cheque, they must also add the legal name of the business.

Numbered companies will very often operate as something other than their legal name, which is unrecognizable to the public.

=== Chile ===
In Chile, a trade name is known as a nombre de fantasía ('fantasy' or 'fiction' name), and the legal name of a business is called a razón social (social name).

=== India ===
In India, it is mandatory for all business establishments, be they private limited companies, LLPs, or sole proprietors, to maintain a distinction between the business's 'Legal Name' (as per incorporation or registration documents) and 'Trade Name'. This Trade Name, which is also commonly referred to as the "doing business as" or "DBA" name, is how a company operates publicly for marketing purposes. The Indian legal and regulatory structure under the jurisdiction of the Ministry of Corporate Affairs (MCA) and the Goods and Services Tax (India) GST framework requires businesses to duly inform of their Trade Name, which is then to be displayed on all their invoices, signage, and in commercial correspondence.

=== Ireland ===
In Ireland, businesses are legally required to register business names where these differ from the surname(s) of the sole trader or partners, or the legal name of a company. The Companies Registration Office publishes a searchable register of such business names.

=== Japan ===
In Japan, historically, it was known as the word "yagō (屋号)", but today it is legally defined as the word "shōgō (商号)" and is commonly referred to as such.

=== Nigeria ===
In Colonial Nigeria, certain tribes had members who used a variety of trading names to conduct business with the Europeans. Two examples were King Perekule VII of Bonny, who was known as Captain Pepple in trade matters, and King Jubo Jubogha of Opobo, who bore the pseudonym Captain Jaja. Both Pepple and Jaja would bequeath their trade names to their royal descendants as official surnames upon their deaths.

=== Singapore ===
In Singapore, there is no filing requirement for a "trading as" name, but there are requirements for disclosure of the underlying business or company's registered name and unique entity number.

=== United Kingdom ===
In the United Kingdom, there is no filing requirement for a business name, defined as "any name under which someone carries on business" that, for a company or limited liability partnership, "is not its registered name", but there are requirements for disclosure of the owner's true name and some restrictions on the use of certain names and sensitive words, and there are also regulations concerning disclosure of the company name (the legal name of the company) for a company, the name of the owner for a sole trader, or the names of the partners for a partnership.

The Office for Students, the higher education regulator for England, uses the term trading name in the register of higher education providers, and requires these to be registered. The Charity Commission of England and Wales uses the terms working name and operating name on the register of charities, with the term working name being used in the Charities Act 2011 (as amended by the Charities Act 2022). The term operating name is also used for government agencies.

=== United States ===
A minority of U.S. states, including Washington, still use the term trade name to refer to "doing business as" (DBA) names. In most U.S. states now, however, DBAs are officially referred to using other terms. Almost half of the states, including New York and Oregon, use the terms assumed business name or assumed name; nearly as many, including Pennsylvania, use the term fictitious name.

For consumer protection purposes, many U.S. jurisdictions require businesses operating with fictitious names to file a DBA statement, though names including the first and last name of the owner may be accepted. This also reduces the possibility of two local businesses operating under the same name, although some jurisdictions do not provide exclusivity for a name, or may allow more than one party to register the same name. Note, though, that this is not a substitute for filing a trademark application. A DBA filing carries no legal weight in establishing trademark rights. In the U.S., trademark rights are acquired by use in commerce, but there can be substantial benefits to filing a trademark application. Sole proprietors are the most common users of DBAs. Sole proprietors are individual business owners who run their businesses themselves. Since most people in these circumstances use a business name other than their own name, it is often necessary for them to get DBAs.

Generally, a DBA must be registered with a local or state government, or both, depending on the jurisdiction. For example, California, Texas and Virginia require a DBA to be registered with each county (or independent city in the case of Virginia) where the owner does business. Maryland and Colorado have DBAs registered with a state agency. Virginia also requires corporations and LLCs to file a copy of their registration with the county or city to be registered with the State Corporation Commission.

DBA statements are often used in conjunction with a franchise. The franchisee will have a legal name under which it may sue and be sued, but will conduct business under the franchiser's brand name (which the public would recognize). A typical real-world example can be found in a well-known pricing mistake case, Donovan v. RRL Corp. (2001), where the named defendant, RRL Corporation, was a Lexus car dealership doing business as "Lexus of Westminster", but remaining a separate legal entity from Lexus, a division of Toyota Motor Sales, USA, Inc.

In California, filing a DBA statement also requires that a notice of the fictitious name be published as a public legal notice in local newspapers for some set period to inform the public of the owner's intent to operate under an assumed name. The law intends to protect the public from fraud, by compelling the business owner to first file or register his fictitious business name with the county clerk, and then making a further public record of it by publishing it in a newspaper. Several other states, such as Illinois, require print notices as well.

=== Uruguay ===
In Uruguay, a trade name is known as a nombre fantasía, and the legal name of business is called a razón social.

== See also ==
- Pen name
- Rebranding
- Service mark
- Trade dress
