= Elementor =

Israeli software company

Elementor Ltd.

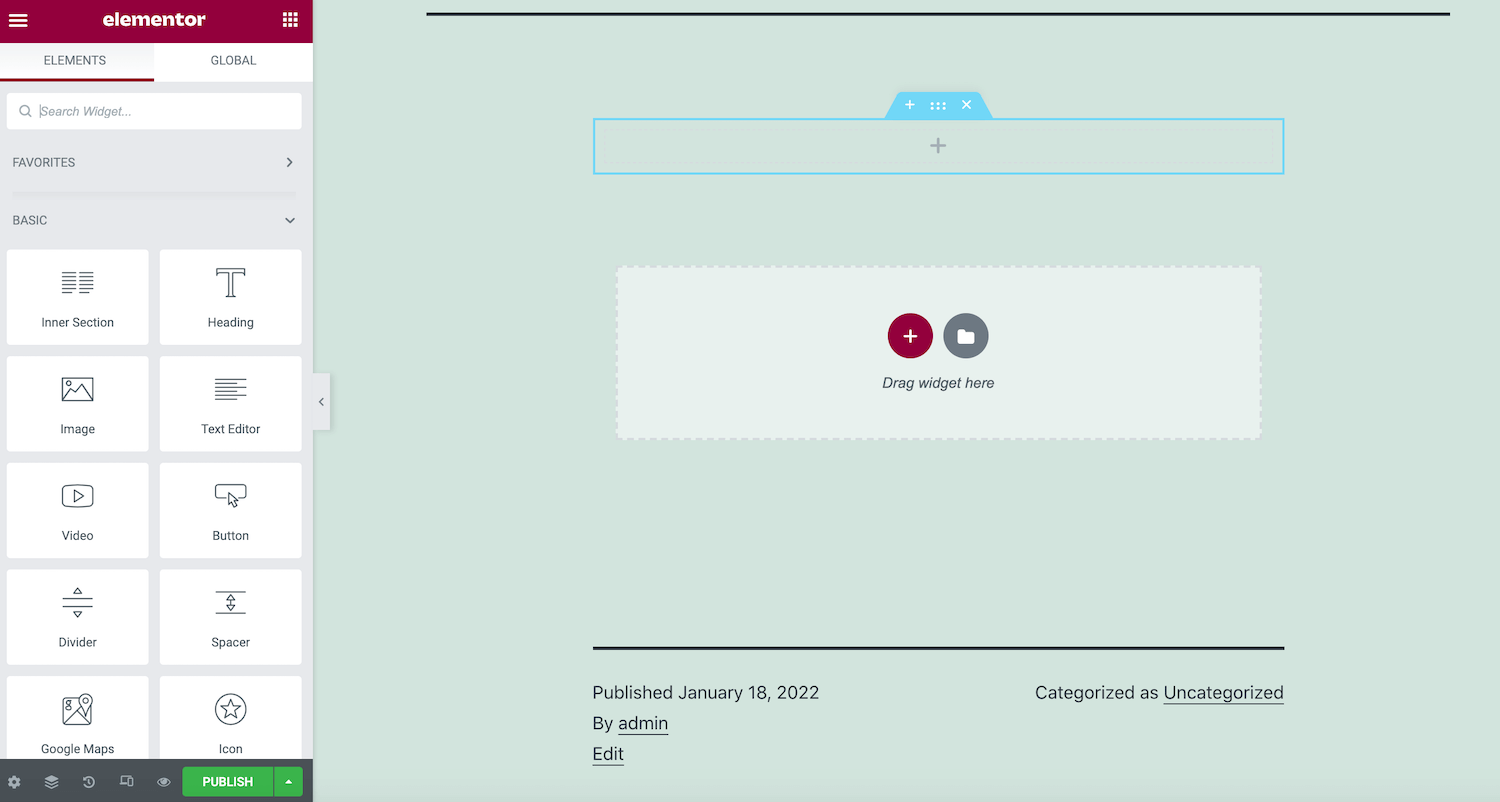
- A WordPress website being edited with Elementor
- Type: Private
- Industry: Internet
- Founded: 2016
- Founder: Yoni Luksenberg, Yakir Sitbon, Ariel Klikstein
- Headquarters: Ramat Gan, Israel
- Area served: Worldwide
- Key people: Yoni Luksenberg, CEO
- Services: Website development
- Website: Official website

Elementor Ltd. is an Israeli software development company primarily known for its WordPress website builder, Elementor. The Elementor website builder allows WordPress users to create and edit websites with a responsive drag-and-drop technique similar to Wix, Metaconex, Readymag or Webflow.

Elementor is available in two versions: a free version and a premium version called Elementor Pro.

Elementor Pro offers additional features for creating more complex websites compared to the free version, which only provides basic page builder functionality. Elementor Pro enables users to customize their websites with a broader range of tools and options.

As of February 2025, Elementor was available in 64 languages and was the most popular WordPress plugin, with over 10 million active installations worldwide. It is an open-source platform licensed under GPLv3 and, according to BuiltWith statistics, it powered 5.07% of the top 1 million websites globally in February 2025.

In its first round of institutional funding in 2020, the company raised $15 million from Lightspeed Venture Partners.

== History ==
Elementor was founded in 2016 by Yoni Luksenberg and Ariel Klikstein.

In May 2019, the Elementor team’s "Hello" theme was listed on WordPress.org. The Hello theme is a minimalist theme framework specifically designed to pair with the Elementor page builder.

Elementor was recognized by Israeli business daily Calcalist as one of the top 50 most promising Israeli startups for 2019.

In 2019, Elementor acquired Layers WP, a WordPress theme brand. That same year, Elementor partnered with A2 Hosting to provide a hosting account for its users.

On March 31, 2020, Elementor launched an expert network for web creators.

In 2025, Elementor introduced AI Copilot, an integrated artificial intelligence assistant that helps users generate content, layouts, and design elements directly within the page builder.
