= In-product communication =

In-product communications (IPC) are messages, content, and related media delivered directly to a user's internet-connected device or software application, with the purpose of informing, gathering feedback from, engaging with, or marketing to that specific user or segment of users at often-higher engagement rates than other digital marketing and online marketing channels.

== Uses ==
=== Marketing ===
In-product marketing is an additional channel in the digital marketing toolkit, which includes email marketing, search engine marketing (SEM), social media marketing, many forms of display advertising, and mobile advertising.

=== Support ===
It can also refer to the strategy used by a company to reach specific segments of their customer base to provide in-product customer service and support, supply training materials, and initiate orders of replacement parts and consumables.

=== Feedback ===
In-product communication can also be a valuable way for businesses to gather user intelligence and feedback on their customer base, as the success of email requests for such information continues to decline.

=== Data Capture ===
Because in-product communications are delivered directly to the device of a user, many in-product communication platforms can auto-capture device information, like serial number, model number, operating system, version number, location, and potentially any additional metadata available from, or agreed-upon by the user.

== Variations ==
In-product communication is an umbrella term to describe several types of direct communication. It may also refer to in-device communication, in-app communication, in-device messaging, or in-app messaging.

=== In-Device Communication ===
In-device communication or in-device messaging is generally accepted as messaging communications directly to a user's device screen, without running through a software application. For example, communications directly to the screen on an internet-connected printer, the screen on the handheld controller of a UAV or drone, or the screen of an internet-connected television, would all be considered in-device. In-device communication relies on a communication platform integrated directly into the operating system of the internet-connected device, allowing the manufacturer to feed messages, gather feedback, and engage with users from directly on the device display.

=== In-App Communication ===
In-app communication or in-app messaging is the act of messaging, gathering feedback, or otherwise communicating with users through a software application, either on a mobile phone or tablet device, or through software on a PC. In this mode of communication, a communication platform is embedded as a software module in the application, generally resulting in much faster deployments of the technology, as compared to the integration timeline of in-device communication platforms.

=== Direct-to-Desktop Communication ===
Direct-to-desktop communication, or on-desktop messaging is the act of messaging, gathering feedback, or otherwise communicating with users through a software application or embedded peripheral driver on a desktop personal computer. Users interact with messages on the screen of the desktop computer, and the device manufacturer serves messaging dynamically from the back end.

== Effectiveness ==
In-product marketing content is often very similar to that of email marketing campaigns, but the segmentation and delivery is more targeted. Because email is historically one of the most effective channels in the digital marketing toolkit, the email channel is becoming more overcrowded and overused, leading to much lower open rates, lower engagement rates, lower click-through rates (CTR), and lower conversion rates. The rise of internet-connected (IOT) devices is enabling a growing number of consumer products manufacturers to take advantage of this channel of marketing communications, to supplement other digital marketing channels.

Because messages and communications are more targeted, and delivered directly to the user's device, engagement rates are often much higher than email marketing.
