= Don E. Schultz =

American academic (1934–2020)

Don Edward Schultz
- Born: January 20, 1934; Wewoka, Oklahoma, U.S.
- Died: June 4, 2020 (aged 86); Chicago, Illinois, U.S.
- Occupations: Professor (Marketing), author, consultant
- Spouse: Heidi Flynn Schultz (b. 1949)
- Children: 3

Academic background
- Education: Bachelors' Degree in Marketing/Journalism University of Oklahoma, 1957; Masters' Degree in Advertising, Michigan State University, 1975; PhD, Michigan State University, 1977

Academic work
- Discipline: Marketing
- Institutions: Michigan State University, Northwestern University, Medill School of Journalism
- Notable works: Integrated Marketing Communications, (1993)
- Notable ideas: Integrated marketing communications

Don Edward Schultz (January 20, 1934 – June 4, 2020) was Professor Emeritus of Service at Northwestern University's Medill School. He was most notable for his research and writing on integrated marketing communications (IMC).

== Education and early career ==
Schultz earned a Bachelor of Business Administration from University of Oklahoma in 1957, a master's degree in advertising from Michigan State University in 1975, and a PhD in mass media from Michigan State in 1977. Schultz began his career in publication sales and management. In 1965, he joined the firm of Tracy-Locke Advertising and Public Relations based in Dallas, Texas, where he gained skills in advertising and marketing communications.

== Academic career ==
In the mid-1970s, Schultz began teaching advertising at the Michigan State University and in 1977, he joined the faculty at Northwestern University, where he became department chair and associate dean.

In 1991, Schultz was part of a team at the Medill School of Journalism, Northwestern University which in conjunction with the American Association of Advertising Agencies (AAAA), began the first empirical study designed to investigate how integrated marketing communications was being used by practitioners. The study focused around understanding the concept and the importance of IMC and also to analyze the extent in which IMC was practiced in all major U.S advertising agencies. When this initial study was replicated by other studies in a number of countries; New Zealand, UK, US, Australia, India, Thailand, South Africa and the Philippines, etc., they demonstrated that the new IMC was far from a "short-lived managerial fad" but rather was "a very clear reaction by advertising agencies and their clients as they are affected by a multitude of factors such as new forms of information technology including development and usage of databases, media fragmentation, client desires for interaction/synergy, and global and regional coordination." Collectively these studies suggested that marketing communications was undergoing a transitional phase.

In 1993, Schultz and his team published the first text-book dedicated to IMC. Their work, simply entitled, Integrated Marketing Communications, described IMC as a totally new way of looking at the whole of marketing communications, rather than looking at each of the parts separately. Also in 1993, Schultz and the Medill School at Northwestern University changed their curriculum to include a focus on this new idea of integrated marketing communications rather than the traditional program which had emphasized advertising.

Often referred to as the "father of integrated marketing", Schultz was the author or co-author of 28 books and 150 trade/academic articles on marketing. His books include: Integrated Marketing Communications (1993); Communicating Globally (2000) and IMC: The Next Generation (2003). He wrote a regular column on Integrated Marketing for Marketing Management magazine, the trade publication of the American Marketing Association.

== Awards and recognition ==
Schultz lectured and consulted for various business groups and resided in the Chicago metropolitan area. He was also the president and founder of Agora, Inc. (not to be confused with Agora, Inc.), a consulting firm based in Evanston, Illinois.

He was the recipient of:

- The Northwestern University, Distinguished Faculty Achievement Award, 2010
- Direct Marketing News’ Emerson Award, 2012
- MMA (Marketing Management Association) Marketing Innovator Award in 2013
- AAA (American Academy of Advertising) Ivan Preston Outstanding Contributions to Research Award, 2014.
