= Re-intermediation =

Re-intermediation in banking and finance can be defined as the movement of investment capital from non-bank investments, back into financial intermediaries. This is usually done in efforts to secure depository insurance on the capital, during times of high risk and volatility in market interest rates. Conceptually, reintermediation can be thought of as an answer to disintermediation, which is the movement of investment funds away from financial intermediaries into other investments. Disintermediation occurs naturally, as competition from different financial firms can allow for higher investment yield, which causes funds to flow away from depository institutions.

== The Banking Act of 1933 and disintermediation ==
=== Federal Deposit Insurance Company ===
Disintermediation in banking and finance is most directly attributed to the massive movements of funds away from bank investments in the 20th century, due to the Banking Act of 1933 and the Banking Act of 1935, which involved the formation of the Federal Deposit Insurance Company. The FDIC is responsible for insuring deposits at banks, and it was created with the purpose of regaining general confidence in the banking system amidst the great depression and the major banking crises that came with it. This type of depository insurance at the time of its creation (following the collapse of several major banks) is the kind of security that is sought after in an investment and in turn this insurance is one of the key factors in the re-intermediation of savings into federally insured depositories. Reintermediation is mainly caused by the desire to insure savings into a secure account and in times of market fluctuation and interest rate volatility in the money market the funds will naturally flow back into savings deposits.

=== Regulation Q ===
The Banking Act of 1933 included a clause called Regulation Q, which established laws that created interest ceilings for all types of deposit accounts at Federally Insured institutions. Regulation Q also prohibited interest-bearing demand deposit accounts, however this piece of the regulation was repealed in the Dodd-Frank Wall Street Reform Act in 2010.

=== Disintermediation ===
The competition from outside money instruments against the maximum savings rate allowed by Regulation Q caused both the creation of countless new financial investment instruments and a mass movement of savings away from federal depositories and into non-bank investments. Withdrawal of funds out federally insured financial intermediaries and depositing those funds into money market instruments can be attributed mainly to the relation of interest yielded by these instruments and interest yielded in bank savings. Disintermediation can also be attributed to ratio of interest yielded by said instruments and interest yielded by treasury bonds.

== eCommerce ==
Although originally attributed to banking and finance, disintermediation slowly evolved into a phrase that essentially means "cutting out the middle-man". Companies developing in the internet era had the initial reaction to develop direct-to-consumer business models which would allow them to centralize their brand and cut the costs of supply chain intermediaries. Unfortunately in this era of business the amount of processes needed for an online company to function properly make it nearly impossible for a firm to produce a product and distribute it directly to the consumer.

=== Re-intermediation ===
Reintermediation in economics can also mean the reintroduction of intermediaries to business processes in an electronic firm. This means that a company involved in eCommerce will partner with intermediaries to perform functions such as supply-chain management, rather than operating in a direct-to-consumer model. Reintermediation is largely a response to the development of disintermediation in eCommerce, because due to the amount of processes performed between manufacturing and direct selling to the consumer companies naturally seek to offset that responsibility, if it makes sense for the firm fiscally.
