= UTM parameters =

URL parameter used for tracking

Urchin Tracking Module (UTM) parameters are five variants of URL parameters used by marketers to track the effectiveness of online marketing campaigns across traffic sources and publishing media. They were introduced by Google Analytics' predecessor Urchin and, consequently, are supported out of the box by Google Analytics. The UTM parameters in a URL identify the campaign that refers traffic to a specific website, and attribute the browser's website session and the sessions after that until the campaign attribution window expires to it. The parameters can be parsed by analytics tools and used to populate reports.

== Use ==
UTM parameters in a URL identify the marketing campaign that refers traffic to a specific website. To define and append the relevant UTM parameters to the appropriate URLs, marketers routinely use simple, spreadsheet-based, or automated UTM builder tools, including the Google Analytics URL Builder for websites. When a hyperlink contains a URL with UTM parameters, the web analytics software of the destination website interprets the parameter information and attributes it to the browser's website session and the sessions after that until the campaign attribution window has expired (by default, six months in Google Analytics).

UTM parameters that are passed to URLs can be parsed by analytics tools such as Google Analytics and Adobe Analytics, with the data used to populate standard and custom analytics reports. Web analytics software may attribute parameters to the browser's current and subsequent sessions until the campaign window has expired.

== Parameters ==
There are five different UTM parameters, which may be used in any order:

Parameter	Purpose	Example
utm_source	Identifies which site sent the traffic, and is a required parameter.	utm_source=google
utm_medium	Identifies what type of link was used, such as email or pay-per-click advertising.	utm_medium=ppc
utm_campaign	Identifies a specific product promotion or strategic campaign.	utm_campaign=spring_sale
utm_term	Identifies search terms.	utm_term=running+shoes
utm_content	Identifies what specifically was clicked to bring the user to the site, such as a banner ad or a text link. It is often used for A/B testing and content-targeted ads.	utm_content=logolink or utm_content=textlink

For example, the following URL contains four of the five UTM parameters:

https://www.example.com/page?utm_content=buffercf3b2&utm_medium=social&utm_source=snapchat.com&utm_campaign=buffer

utm_content=buffercf3b2&utm_medium=social&utm_source=snapchat.com&utm_campaign=buffer

== See also ==
- Google Ads § Conversion tracking
- Social media analytics
