= Readymag =

American website development company

- Type: Private
- Industry: Internet
- Founded: 2012; 14 years ago
- Founders: Diana Kasay; Anton Herasymenko; Kirill Danchenko
- Headquarters: New York City, USA
- Area served: Worldwide
- Key people: Diana Kasay (CEO)
- Products: Website builder, design tool
- Services: Website builder, no-code design platform
- Website: readymag.com

Readymag is an American company that develops browser-based, no-code design platform with the same name, that facilitates the creation of websites, digital portfolios, presentations, and online publications. Readymag is noted for its animation and interaction features, enabling designers to create scroll effects, transitions, overlays, and complex multi-step interactions without coding. TechCrunch has described the platform as a 'hybrid solution' between template-driven site builders and developer-centric platforms due to its combination of tools and a freeform editor.

The platform provides users with detailed controls for adjusting text elements, including ligatures, variable fonts, stylistic sets, fractions, and small capitals. These features are often highlighted as core to the platform's functionality, with an emphasis on providing flexibility and precision in type design. It also supports freeform, editorial-style storytelling and animations, positioning itself between entry-level builders and developer-intensive platforms.

The company maintains an online editorial section that publishes digital content and projects. The content often features visually focused layouts and media using the platform's design tools.

== History ==
Readymag was founded in 2012 and launched publicly in 2013 as a bootstrapped company in the United States. Initially conceived as a platform for digital magazines, it evolved into a versatile design tool for websites, portfolios, and campaigns. The idea for Readymag began in 2009 with a focus on creating online magazines. The founders, Ukrainian designer Anton Herasymenko and Russian nationals Diana Kasay and Kirill Danchenko, initially self-funded the project and built a community around it. After a successful launch on Product Hunt, they raised their first round of funding. In an interview with The Brand Identity, CEO and co-founder Diana Kasay described Readymag’s growth from start-up to a sustainable business, noting its independence from external investment and focus on long-term resilience.

== Features ==
Readymag functions as a no-code, browser-based design tool centered on flexibility and visual storytelling. Unlike template-driven site builders, it provides a freeform editor where designers can position elements without rigid grids or constraints. The platform includes typographic tools, offering a built-in library of free fonts—including Google Fonts, Adobe Fonts, and independent typefaces—as well as the option to upload custom fonts. Users can also access advanced settings such as ligatures, stylistic sets, fractions, small caps, and variable font support. Collaboration features allow multiple contributors to edit projects, leave feedback, and review changes, making the tool usable in both individual and team workflows.

=== Business model ===
Readymag operates on a freemium and subscription-based model. It offers a free, full-featured account to get started, with paid plans required to connect a custom domain and access more advanced features.

=== Target audience ===
Readymag is primarily used by designers, creative agencies, freelancers, and businesses that prioritize visual aesthetics and unique, interactive web experiences. It's used for creating portfolios, presentations, digital magazines, editorials, and company websites.

== Community initiatives ==
Readymag's editorial initiatives include the "Designing Women" series, a web-based project dedicated to profiling the work of women and non-binary designers. First launched in 2019, the series was relaunched in 2024 with a focus on highlighting the impact of women in the design industry throughout the 20th and 21st centuries. As part of the 2024 relaunch, the company introduced the ReadyLaunch Grant, an initiative designed to provide financial and professional support for media projects by underrepresented creatives. The grant provides four fellowships, each valued at $2,000, along with a one-year membership to the Female Design Council, access to its Mentor Match Program, and assistance with media coverage. The grant supports various project types, including newsletters, digital zines, and podcasts.

The company also collaborated with the Type Directors Club on The Faces Behind Typefaces, an editorial recognizing typographers across generations and identities.

In 2024, Readymag organized the Design Layers Conference, a one-off free online event that explored the ethical balance in design practice. The program featured talks on sustainability, inclusivity, and responsible creativity by designers including Samar Makaaroun, Yah Leng Yu, Abb-d Taiyo, Veronica Fuerte, and Cat How.

== Reception ==
Fast Company reviewed Readymag, noting its no-code features, advanced typography, and animation capabilities. The publication also highlighted its business model as a bootstrapped company. Creative Boom covered Readymag's "The Faces Behind Typefaces" project, describing it as an in-depth look at type design. Additionally, It’s Nice That also featured Readymag's perspective on digital typography in an article focused on online readability.

== Awards and recognition ==
- Red Dot Award (2023): The Faces Behind Typefaces received the Red Dot Award for Brands & Communication Design.
- Indigo Design Award (2023): Recognized as Best Digital Tool.
- Webby Award nomination (2023): The Faces Behind Typefaces nominated in “Marketing & Content Management”.
- Fast Company Innovation by Design Award (2024): Awarded in the "Established Excellence" category for Readymag’s long-term commitment to accessible design and advanced typographic and animation tools.
- Webby Award nomination (2025): Design Layers Conference nominated in “Events & Conferences”.

== Readymag Website of the Year Award ==
The Readymag Website of the Year Award' is an annual international digital design competition to recognize outstanding web projects created using the Readymag platform. The award highlights websites that demonstrate excellence in visual communication, interactive design, storytelling, and creative use of contemporary web technologies.

The competition features several categories, including Website of the Year, Best Visual Style, Interactive Experience, Editorial Project, and Experimental Design. Winners are selected by a jury composed of designers, art directors, creative technologists, and industry experts.

The Readymag Website of the Year Award is known for showcasing independent creators, design studios, and commercial teams whose projects contribute to emerging trends in digital design and web-based storytelling.
