= Monitorix =

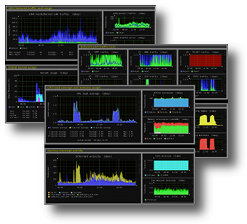

- Original author(s): Jordi Sanfeliu i Font
- Initial release: September 11, 2005
- Stable release: 3.16.0 / November 27, 2024
- Repository: github.com/mikaku/Monitorix
- Written in: Perl
- Operating system: Linux, FreeBSD, OpenBSD, NetBSD
- Size: 399KiB
- Type: Monitoring
- License: GNU General Public License, version 2
- Website: www.monitorix.org

Monitorix is a computer network monitoring tool that periodically collects system data and uses the web interface to show the information as graphs. Monitorix allows monitoring of overall system performance, and can help detect bottlenecks, failures, unusually long response times and other anomalies.

One part of the tool is a collector, called monitorix. This Perl daemon is started automatically like any other system service. The second program of Monitorix is a CGI script (monitorix.cgi). Since version 3.0 Monitorix has its own HTTP server included, what makes installing an own web server unnecessary.

Monitorix is free software licensed under the terms of the GNU General Public License version 2 (GPLv2) as published by the Free Software Foundation. It uses the RRDtool (written by Tobi Oetiker) and is written in Perl.

== See also ==
- RRDtool
- Collectd
- Munin
- Comparison of network monitoring systems
