= OpenWrt =

Linux distribution for wireless routers and embedded systems

- OpenWrt 18.06.1 login screen
- Developer: OpenWrt Project
- OS family: Linux (Unix-like)
- Working state: Current
- Source model: Open source
- Initial release: January 2004; 22 years ago
- Latest release: 25.12.6 / 18 October 2026; 30 days ago
- Latest preview: 25.12.0-rc5 / 19 February 2026; 8 months ago
- Repository: git.openwrt.org
- Available in: English, Chinese, Polish, Portuguese, Punjabi, Spanish, Welsh + 25 partially translated languages
- Update method: opkg (up to 24.10 release)/apk (25.12.0+)
- Package manager: opkg/apk
- Supported platforms: 50 different platforms using the following Instruction sets: ARC, ARM, m68k, MIPS, PowerPC, SPARC, SuperH, x86, x86-64
- Kernel type: Monolithic (Linux)
- Userland: BusyBox
- Default user interface: CLI, WebUIs (LuCI)
- License: Free software (GPL and other licenses)
- Official website: openwrt.org

OpenWrt (from open wireless router) is an open-source project for embedded operating systems based on Linux, primarily used on embedded devices to route network traffic. The main components are Linux, util-linux, musl, and BusyBox. All components have been optimized to be small enough to fit into the limited storage and memory available in home routers.

OpenWrt is configured using a command-line interface (ash shell) or a web interface (LuCI). There are more than 9000 optional software packages available for installation via the apk package management system.

OpenWrt can run on various types of devices, including CPE routers, residential gateways, SBCs, smartphones, pocket computers (e.g., Ben NanoNote). It is also possible to run OpenWrt on personal computers and laptops.

== History ==
The OpenWrt project was started in 2004 after Linksys had built the firmware for their WRT54G series of wireless routers with code licensed under the GNU General Public License. Under the terms of that license, Linksys was required to make the source code of its modified version available under the same license, which enabled independent developers to create derivative versions. Support was originally limited to the WRT54G series, but has since been expanded to include many other routers and devices from many different manufacturers.

Using this code as a base and later as a reference, developers created a Linux distribution that offers many features not previously found in consumer-level routers. Early on some features required proprietary software. For example, prior to OpenWrt 8.09 (based on Linux 2.6.25 and the b43 kernel module) WLAN for many Broadcom-based routers could only be had via the proprietary wl.o module (and which required Linux 2.4.x).

OpenWrt releases were historically named after cocktails, such as White Russian, Kamikaze, Backfire, Attitude Adjustment, Barrier Breaker and Chaos Calmer, and their recipes were included in the message of the day (motd) displayed after logging in using the command-line interface.

In May 2016, OpenWrt was forked by a group of core OpenWrt contributors due to disagreements on internal process. The fork was dubbed Linux Embedded Development Environment (LEDE). The schism was reconciled a year later. Following the remerger, announced in January 2018, the OpenWrt branding is preserved, with many of the LEDE processes and rules used. The LEDE project name was used for v17.01, with development versions of 18.01 branded OpenWrt, dropping the original cocktail based naming scheme.

=== Releases ===
Version (Code name)	Initial release date	Kernel	Latest version	Latest release date	EoL (Projected)	libc	Notes
"Stable Release"	January 2004	?	—N/a			uClibc	Based on Linksys GPL sources for WRT54G and a buildroot from the uClibc project
0.9 (White Russian)	February 5, 2007	2.4.30	—N/a			uClibc	NVRAM-based, nas, wl. Supported platform: brcm-2.4.
7.06 (Kamikaze)	June 2, 2007	2.6.19	7.09	September 30, 2007	—N/a	uClibc	Using opkg. Supported platforms: atheros-2.6, au1000-2.6, brcm-2.4, brcm47xx-2.6, ixp4xx-2.6, imagicbox-2.6, rb532-2.6 and x86-2.6.
8.09 (Kamikaze)	February 19, 2009	2.6.26	8.09.2	January 10, 2010	—N/a	uClibc	New platform: ar71xx.
10.03 (Backfire)	April 7, 2010	2.6.32	10.03.1	December 21, 2011	—N/a	uClibc	Supported platforms: adm5120_mips, adm5120_mipsel, ar7, ar71xx, atheros, au1000, avr32, brcm-2.4, brcm47xx, brcm63xx, cobalt, ep80579, ifxmips, ixp4xx, kirkwood, octeon, orion, ppc40x, ppc44x, rb532, rdc, x86 and xburst.
12.09 (Attitude Adjustment)	April 25, 2013	3.3	—N/a			uClibc	CoDel (network scheduler) backported from Linux 3.5 to 3.3. New platforms: ramips, bcm2708 (Raspberry Pi) and others.
14.07 (Barrier Breaker)	October 2, 2014	3.10	—N/a			uClibc	New platforms: i.MX23, i.MX6.
15.05 (Chaos Calmer)	September 11, 2015	3.18	15.05.1	March 16, 2016	2016, March	uClibc	nftables (available since Linux kernel 3.12); New platforms: TBA if any
17.01 (Reboot (OpenWrt/LEDE))	February 22, 2017	4.4	17.01.7	June 20, 2019	2019, June	musl	There were only release notes for "OpenWrt/LEDE 17.01.7 - Seventh Service Release - June 2019" with a code revision "rTODO-2252731af4". The official announcement of "OpenWrt/LEDE v17.01.7 service release" was never made in the OpenWrt Forum due to GPG signing certs issues.
18.06	July 31, 2018	4.9 / 4.14	18.06.9	December 9, 2020	2020, December	musl	?
19.07	January 6, 2020	4.14	19.07.10	April 20, 2022	2022, April	musl	WPA3 support. Flow offloading (beta).
21.02	September 4, 2021	5.4	21.02.7	May 1, 2023	2023, May	musl	WPA3, TLS and HTTPS support included by default, initial DSA support, LXC and ujail support
22.03	September 6, 2022	5.10	22.03.7	July 25, 2024	2024, July	musl	Firewall4 based on nftables, many new devices added, more targets converted to DSA, dark mode in LuCI, year 2038 problem handled, core components updated.
23.05	October 13, 2023	5.15	23.05.6	August 20, 2025	2025, August	musl	New devices added, ipq40xx target converted to DSA, default cryptographic library switched to mbedtls, core components updated.
24.10	February 6, 2025	6.6	24.10.8	July 26, 2026	2026, September	musl	New devices added, ipq806x target converted to DSA, improved support for Wi-Fi 6 (802.11ax) and initial support for Wi-Fi 7 (802.11be), core components updated.
25.12 (Dave's Guitar)	March 5, 2026	6.12	25.12.6	October 18, 2026		musl	Switch package manager from opkg to apk, Attended Sysupgrade (ASU) is now installed by default.
Legend: Unsupported Supported Latest version

=== LEDE ===
LEDE

- Login banner
- Developer: LEDE Project
- OS family: Unix-like
- Working state: Merged with OpenWrt
- Source model: Open source
- Initial release: May 2016; 10 years ago
- Repository: git.openwrt.org
- Available in: 26 languages
- Update method: opkg
- Package manager: opkg
- Supported platforms: 23 platforms using the following Instruction sets: AVR32, ARM, CRIS, m68k, MIPS, PowerPC, SPARC, SuperH, Ubicom32, x86, x86-64
- Kernel type: Monolithic (Linux)
- Userland: BusyBox, GNU
- Default user interface: CLI, WebUIs
- License: Free software (GPL and other licenses)
- Official website: lede-project.org

The Linux Embedded Development Environment (LEDE) project was a fork of the OpenWrt project and shared many of the same goals. It was created in May 2016 by a group of core OpenWrt contributors due to disagreements on OpenWrt internal processes. The schism was nominally reconciled a year later in May 2017 pending approval of the LEDE developers. The remerger preserves the OpenWrt branding, but uses many of the LEDE processes and rules. The remerge proposal vote was passed by LEDE developers in June 2017, and formally announced in January 2018. The merging process was completed before the OpenWrt 18.06 release.

Version	Release date	Kernel	Notes
17.01.0	2017-02-22	4.4.50	first stable release
17.01.1	2017-04-19	4.4.61	bug fixes and enhancements
17.01.2	2017-06-12	4.4.71	security fixes
17.01.3	2017-10-03	4.4.89	security fixes
17.01.4	2017-10-18	4.4.92	security fixes (KRACK, as far as addressable by server side fixes)
17.01.5	2018-07-18	4.4.140	security fixes
17.01.6	2018-09-03	4.4.153	security fixes

== Features ==
OpenWrt features a writeable root file system, enabling users to modify any file and easily install additional software. This is in contrast with other firmware based on read-only file systems which don't allow modifying installed software without rebuilding and flashing a complete firmware image. This is accomplished by overlaying a read-only compressed SquashFS file system with a writeable JFFS2 file system using overlayfs. Additional software can be installed with the opkg package manager and the package repository contains approximately 8000 packages (by 2022).

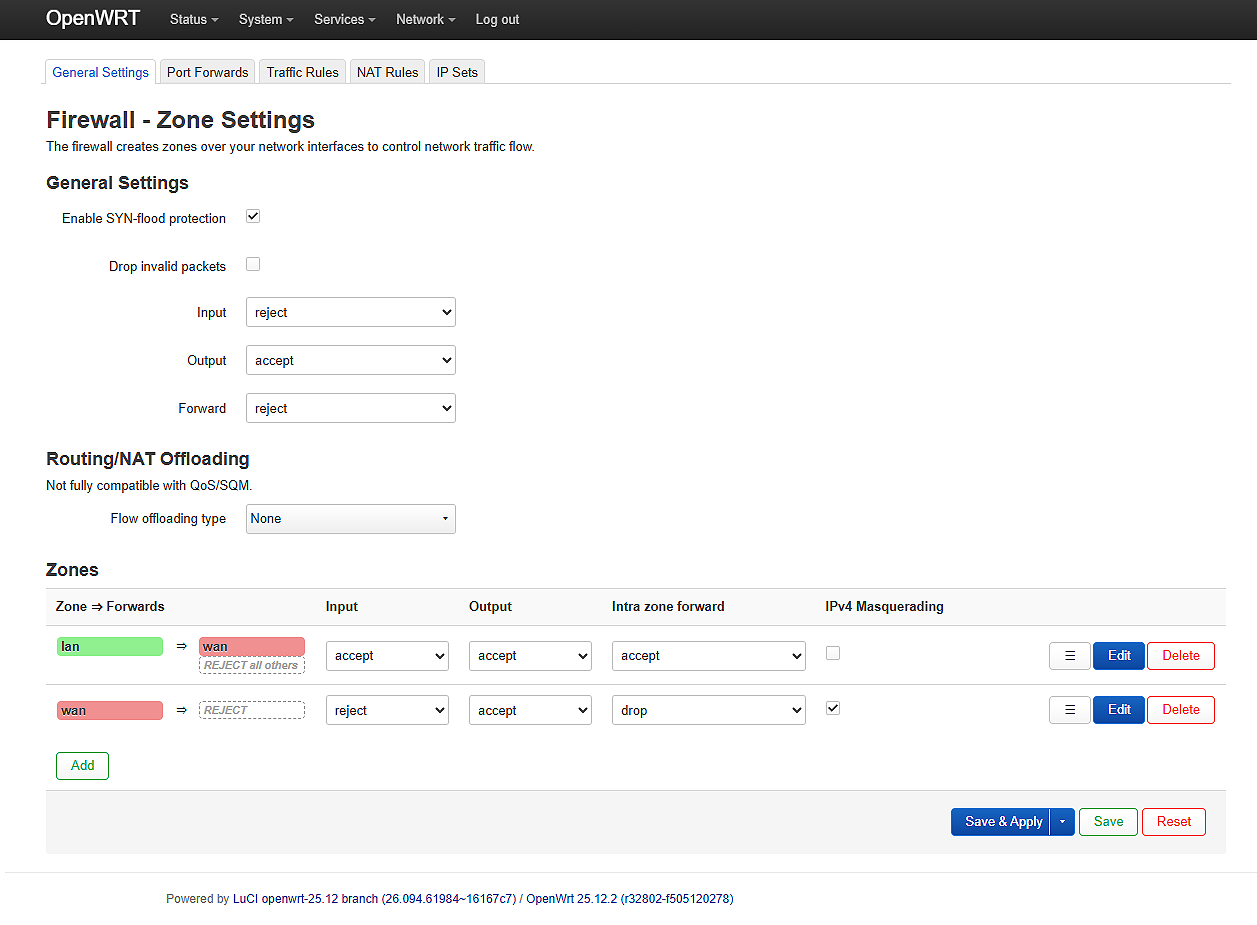
LuCI

OpenWrt can be configured through either a command-line interface or a web interface called LuCI. OpenWrt provides set of scripts called UCI (unified configuration interface) to unify and simplify configuration through the command-line interface. Additional web interfaces, such as Gargoyle, are also available.

OpenWrt provides regular bug fixes and security updates even for devices that are no longer supported by their manufacturers.

OpenWrt provides exhaustive possibilities to configure common network-related features, like IPv4, IPv6, DNS, DHCP, routing, firewall, NAT, port forwarding and WPA.

Other features include:

- Extensible configuration of the entire hardware drivers, e.g. built-in network switches and their VLAN-capabilities, WNICs, DSL modems, FX, available hardware buttons, etc.
- Mesh networking through B.A.T.M.A.N., OLSR and IEEE 802.11s-capabilities of the WNIC drivers and other ad hoc mesh routing protocols that have been implemented within Linux.
- Wireless functionality, e.g. make the device act as a wireless repeater, a wireless access point, a wireless bridge, a captive portal, or a combination of these with e.g. ChilliSpot, WiFiDog Captive Portal, etc.
- Wireless security: Packet injection, e.g. Airpwn, lorcon, e.a.
- Dynamically configured port forwarding protocols PCP, NAT-PMP, and UPnP IGD
- Port knocking
- TR-069 (CWMP) client
- IPS via Snort
- Active queue management (AQM) through the network scheduler of the Linux kernel, with many available queuing disciplines. CoDel has been backported to Kernel 3.3. This encapsulates Traffic shaping to ensure fair distribution of bandwidth among multiple users and quality of service (QoS) for simultaneous use of applications such as VoIP, online gaming, and streaming media without experiencing the negative impacts of link saturation.
- Load balancing for use with multiple ISPs using source-specific routing
- IP tunneling (GRE, OpenVPN, pseudowire, WireGuard, etc.)
- Extensible realtime network monitoring and statistics through e.g. RRDtool, Collectd, Nagios, Munin lite, Zabbix, etc.
- Dynamic DNS services to maintain a fixed domain name with an ISP that does not provide a static IP address
- OpenWrt supports any hardware that has Linux support; devices that can be connected (e.g. over USB) include
  - Printers
  - Mobile broadband modems
  - Webcams
  - Sound cards
- Notable software packages to use the hardware support are
  - File sharing via SAMBA, (Windows-compatible), NFS, FTP, SFTP. Printer sharing over the print server for CUPS (spooling) or p910nd (non-spooling)
  - PulseAudio, Music Player Daemon, Audio/Video streaming via DLNA/UPnP AV standards, iTunes (DAAP) server
  - Asterisk (PBX)
  - MQ Telemetry Transport through Mosquitto

== Development ==
OpenWrt's development environment and build system, known together as OpenWrt Buildroot, are based on a heavily modified Buildroot system. OpenWrt Buildroot is a set of Makefiles and patches that automates the process of building a complete Linux-based OpenWrt system for an embedded device, by building and using an appropriate cross-compilation toolchain.

Embedded devices usually use a different processor than the one found in host computers used for building their OpenWrt system images, requiring a cross-compilation toolchain. Such a compilation toolchain runs on a host system but generates code for a targeted embedded device and its processor's instruction set architecture (ISA). For example, if a host system uses x86 and a target system uses MIPS32, the regular compilation toolchain of the host runs on x86 and generates code for x86 architecture, while the cross-compilation toolchain runs on x86 and generates code for the MIPS32 architecture. OpenWrt Buildroot automates this whole process to work on the instruction set architectures of most embedded devices and host systems.

OpenWrt Buildroot provides the following features:

- Makes it easy to port software across architectures
- Uses kconfig (Linux kernel menuconfig) for the configuration of all options
- Provides an integrated cross-compiler toolchain (gcc, ld, uClibc etc.)
- Provides an abstraction for autotools (automake, autoconf), CMake and SCons
- Handles standard OpenWrt image build workflow: downloading, patching, configuration, compilation and packaging
- Provides a number of common fixes for known badly behaving packages

Besides building system images, OpenWrt development environment also provides a mechanism for simplified cross-platform building of OpenWrt software packages. Source code for each software package is required to provide a Makefile-like set of building instructions, and an optional set of patches for bug fixes or footprint optimizations.

== Hardware compatibility ==
OpenWrt runs many different routers and includes a table of compatible hardware on its website. In its buyer's guide, it notes that users recommend devices equipped with wireless chips from either Qualcomm's Atheros, Ralink (now MediaTek) or any vendor with open source drivers and specifications. It specifically avoids Broadcom chipsets as the feature set is very limited due to having no open drivers. OpenWrt also recommends choosing a device with a minimum of 16 MB of flash and 128 MB of RAM, preferably higher amounts.

== Adoption ==
OpenWrt, especially its Buildroot build system, has been adopted as the structure for other efforts. For example

- AltiWi "one-time-fee-only" replacement for Cloudtrax.
- Bufferbloat.net (Cerowrt)
- Freifunk and other mesh network communities
- IETF IPv6 integration projects HIPnet and HomeNet are OpenWrt-based
- prplOS, carrier-grade framework designed to power ISPs routers and gateways made by Prpl Foundation
- SIMET Box, developed by NIC.br, is OpenWrt-based

=== Derivative projects ===
- AREDN The Amateur Radio Emergency Data Network uses a firmware based on OpenWrt: GitHub Project
- CeroWrt – (2011–2014) project to resolve bufferbloat in home networking, support IPv6, integrate DNSSEC, for wired and wireless, to complement the debloat-testing kernel tree and provide a platform for real-world testing of bufferbloat fixes. The CeroWRT project is completely by 2014, when the finalized fixes were merged into OpenWRT. The "Bufferbloat project" behind CeroWRT went on to research new methods such as CAKE.
- Coova chilli – OpenWrt-based with focus on wireless hotspots, a fork of chillifire with focus on wireless hotspot management
- Flukso – Wireless sensor nodes using an Atheros AR2317 chipset running a patched OpenWrt OS for communication. Sources and hardware schematics available on GitHub.
- Fon – OpenWrt-based wireless routers acting as hotspots. Sources and toolchain available on fonosfera.org
- FreeWRT – a meta-distribution designed for vintage Broadcom WLAN routers, such as the Linksys WRT54G and Asus WL500g. Not related to a project (with same name) based on Sveasoft firmware.
- Gargoyle – a web interface for OpenWrt with a strong emphasis on usability that later forked into a separate distribution
- Gluon – Framework for building OpenWrt-based firmwares fitted for mesh network deployment: GitHub Project
- JUCIWRT – a modern distribution using the JUCI webgui that later became an OpenWrt feed instead. The source code for JUCI is available at mkschreder/juci and is still usable by installing openwrt feed found at mkschreder/juci-openwrt-feed
- libreCMC – OpenWrt-based distribution which excludes non-free software or binary blobs, endorsed by the Free Software Foundation
- LibreMesh – Framework for creating OpenWrt-based firmwares for wireless mesh nodes. GitHub Project
- Linino – OpenWrt-based distribution for the MIPS-based Arduino Yùn: GitHub Project
- Midge Linux – an OpenWrt-based distribution for devices based on Infineon Technologies ADM-5120 SoCs, such as Edimax BR-6104K and BR-6104KP.
- OpenMPTCProuter – aggregation of multiple Internet connections using Multipath TCP
- OpenSAN – iSCSI target Storage Area Network realization.
- PacketProtector – OpenWrt-based security distribution that includes IDS, IPS, VPN, and web antivirus capabilities. Packages included Snort, Snort-inline, FreeRADIUS, OpenVPN, DansGuardian and ClamAV. These tools were accessible via the old web GUI management interface of OpenWrt, called X-Wrt or webif^2. Project ended on June 7, 2012.
- Qualcomm's QCA Software Development Kit (QSDK) which is being used as a development basis by many OEMs is an OpenWrt derivative
- RutOS – an operating system for all Teltonika routers, based on OpenWrt. Source code found at GPL - Teltonika Networks Wiki.
- SmoothWAN – aggregation of multiple Internet connections and network conditioning using Speedify, Engarde and tinyfecvpn.
- Turris Omnia and Turris MOX routers run on an OpenWrt derivative
- Ubiquiti's wireless router firmwares are based on OpenWrt
- Diverse grassroots projects for wireless community networks, including Freifunk, Libre-Mesh and qMp
- Some TP-Link, Xiaomi, ZyXEL and D-Link router firmwares are derived from OpenWrt
- Friendly Electronics manufactures the NanoPi series of SoC devices and makes available an OpenWRT derivative OS called FriendlyWRT.
- Ansuel's Technicolor Custom GUI a modified management web interface developed on the basis of the official Technicolor for Homeware firmware, which runs a fork of OpenWrt, unlocking Technicolor Modem/Routers.

== See also ==
- List of router firmware projects
- Prpl Foundation
- Banana Pi
