= Comparison of network monitoring systems =

The following tables compare general and technical information for several notable network monitoring systems. For more information, please refer to the individual product articles.

== Features ==
Name	IP SLA reports	Logical grouping	Trending	Trend prediction	Auto discovery	Agentless	SNMP	Syslog	Plugins	Triggers / alerts	MIB compiler	Web app	Distributed monitoring	Inventory	Platform	Data storage method	License	Maps	Access control	IPv6	Latest release date	Latest release version
Cacti	Yes	Yes	Yes	Yes	Yes	Yes	Yes	Yes	Yes	Yes	No	Full Control	Yes	Yes	PHP	RRDtool, MySQL, MariaDB	GNU GPL	Via plugin	Yes	Yes	2025-03-23	1.2.30
Checkmk	Yes	Yes	Yes	Yes	Yes	Yes	Yes	Yes	Yes	Yes	No	Full Control	Yes	Yes	C, Python	RRDtool	GNU GPL	Yes	Yes	Yes	2025-05-06	2.4
collectd	No	No	No	No	Push model; multicast possible	Yes	Yes	Yes	Yes	Yes	No	Viewing	Yes	No	C	RRDtool	GNU GPL	No	Apache ACL	Yes	2020-09-03	5.12
Cruz	Yes	Yes	Yes	No	Yes	Yes	Yes	Yes	Yes	Yes	No	Full Control	Yes	Yes	Java, C++, .NET	MySQL, Oracle	Commercial	Yes	Yes	Yes	2019-02	8.0.0
FreeNATS	Yes	Yes	No	No	Yes	No	No	Via plugin	Yes	In PHP Code	No	Full Control	No	No	PHP	MySQL	GNU GPL	No	Yes	Unknown	2018-11-14	1.20.1b
Ganglia	No	Yes	Yes	No	Via gmond check in	No	Via plugin	No	Yes	No	No	Viewing	Yes	Unknown	C, PHP	RRDtool	BSD	Yes	No	Unknown	2016-06-14	3.7.2
Icinga	Via plugin	Yes	Yes	No	Via plugin	Yes	Via plugin	Via plugin	Yes	Yes	No	Full Control	Yes	Via plugin	C	MariaDB, MySQL, PostgreSQL	GNU GPL	Yes	Yes	Yes	2025-06-18	2.15.0
InterMapper	Yes	Yes	Yes	No	Yes	Yes	Yes	Yes	Yes	Yes	No	Viewing	Yes	Yes	Windows, Linux & Mac OS	PostgreSQL	Limited free, Commercial	Yes	Yes	Yes	2017-07	6.1.5
isyVmon	Yes	Yes	Yes	No	Via plugin	No	Yes	Yes	Yes	Yes	No	Full Control	Yes	Via plugin	PHP	RRDtool, MySQL	Limited free, Commercial	Via plugin	Yes	Yes	Unknown	Unknown
Munin	No	Yes	Yes	Yes	No	No	Yes	No	Yes	Partial	No	Viewing	Via nodes	Unknown	Perl	RRDtool	GNU GPL	Unknown	Unknown	Yes	2026-09-20	2.0.78
Nagios	Via plugin	Yes	Yes	No	Via plugin	Yes	Via plugin	Via plugin	Yes	Yes	No	Yes	Yes	Via plugin	C	Flat file, SQL (via ndoutils), MySql (Via Nconf)	GNU GPL	Yes	Yes	Yes	2022-04-14	4.4.7
Netdisco	No	No	No	No	Yes	Yes	Yes	Yes	Yes	Yes	No	Yes	Yes	Yes	Perl	PostgreSQL	BSD	Yes	Yes	Yes	2024-09-13	2.079001
NetXMS	Unknown	Yes	No	No	Yes	Yes	Yes	Yes	Yes	Yes	Yes	Yes	Yes	Yes	C, Java	PostgreSQL, PostgreSQL with TimescaleDB, MariaDB, MySQL, MS SQL, Oracle, SQLite	GNU GPL	Yes	Yes	Yes	2024-04-15	4.5.6
NeuralStar	Yes	Yes	Yes	No	Yes	Yes	Yes	Yes	Yes	Yes	No	Full Control	Yes	Yes	Unknown	MS SQL	Commercial	Yes	Yes	Yes	Unknown	Unknown
op5 Monitor	Yes	Yes	Yes	Yes	Yes	Yes	Yes	Yes	Yes	Yes	No	Yes	Yes	Via plugin	C, PHP	Flat file, SQL	Limited free, Commercial	Yes	Yes	Yes	Monthly	7.3.0
OpenKBM	Yes	Yes	Yes	No	Yes	Yes	Yes	Yes	Yes	Yes	No	Yes	Yes	Yes	Unknown	Proprietary with JDBC support	Commercial	Yes	Yes	Yes	Unknown	Unknown
OpenNMS	Yes	Yes	Yes	Yes	Yes	Yes	Yes	Yes	Yes	Yes	Yes	Full Control	Yes	Yes	Java	JRobin / RRDTool / Apache Cassandra, PostgreSQL	AGPLv3	Yes	Yes	Yes	2026-03-16	35.0.4
OPNET's AppResponse Xpert	Yes	Yes	Yes	Yes	Yes	Yes	Yes	No	Yes	Yes	No	Viewing, Acknowledging, Reporting	Yes	No	Unknown	Unknown	Commercial	Yes	Yes	Unknown	Unknown	Unknown
OSI NetExpert	Yes	Yes	Yes	Yes	Yes	No	Yes	Yes	Yes	Yes	No	Yes	Yes	Yes	Java, C++	Oracle	Commercial	Yes	Yes	Yes	2013-04	10.0
Pandora FMS	Yes	Yes	Yes	Yes	Yes	Yes	Yes	Yes	Yes	Yes	No	Full Control	Yes	Yes	Perl, PHP, C++, JavaScript	MySQL, Percona Server for MySQL	GPLv2, Commercial	Yes	Yes	Yes	2024-06-11	7.0 NG 777
PA Server Monitor	No	Yes	Yes	Yes	Yes	Yes	Yes	Yes	Yes	Yes	Yes	Viewing, Acknowledging, Reporting	Yes	Yes	Windows, C++, .NET	SQLite, Microsoft SQL Server	Limited free, Commercial	Yes	Yes	Yes	2025-06	9.5
Performance Co-Pilot	No	Yes	Yes	No	Yes	Optional, Limited	Yes	Yes	Yes	Yes	No	Viewing	Yes	Yes	C Perl, Python, POSIX, MinGW	Flat file	GPL, LGPL	No	Yes	Yes	2025-03-27	6.3.7
PRTG	Yes	Yes	Yes	No	Yes	Yes	Yes	Yes	Yes	Yes	Yes	Full Control	Yes	Yes	Delphi_(software)	Flat file	Limited free, Commercial	Yes	Yes	Yes	2025-03-18	25.1.104
ScienceLogic	Yes	Yes	Yes	Yes	Yes	Yes	Yes	Yes	Yes	Yes	No	Full Control	Yes	Yes	Python	MySQL	Commercial	Yes	Yes	Yes	Unknown	Unknown
SevOne	Yes	Yes	Yes	Yes	Yes	Yes	Yes	Yes	Yes	Yes	No	Full Control	Yes	Yes	C, C++, PHP	MySQL	Commercial	Yes	Yes	Yes	2022-11	6.4
Shinken	Via plugin	Yes	Yes	No	Yes	Yes	Via plugin	Via plugin	Yes	Yes	No	Viewing, Acknowledging, Reporting	Yes	Via plugin	Python	Flat file, MySQL, Oracle, Graphite, Sqlite, MongoDB	AGPL	Yes	Yes	Yes	2016-03-10	2.4.3
SolarWinds	Yes	Yes	Yes	Yes	Yes	Partial	Yes	Yes	Yes	Yes	No	Full Control	Yes	Yes	.NET	SQL	Commercial	Yes	Yes	Yes	Unknown	Unknown
Spiceworks	Unknown	Yes	Unknown	Unknown	Yes	Yes	Unknown	Unknown	Yes	Yes	Unknown	Unknown	Unknown	Yes	PHP	Sqlite	Unknown	Yes	Unknown	Unknown	2018-03-21	7.5.00107
Xymon/Hobbit	Yes	Yes	Yes	No	Via plugin	Via plugin	Via plugin	No	Yes	Yes	No	Viewing, Acknowledging, Reporting	Yes	Via plugin	C, Shell	Flat file, RRDTool, MySQL via plugin	GNU GPL	Via plugin	Apache ACL	No	2019-09-05	4.3.30
Zabbix	Yes	Yes	Yes	Yes	Yes	Yes	Yes	Yes	Yes	Yes	No	Full Control	Yes	Yes	C, PHP	MariaDB, MySQL, Oracle, Percona Server, PostgreSQL, SQLite	AGPLv3	Yes	Yes	Yes	2025-09-29; 2025-09-30; 2025-10-01	7.0.19
Zenoss Core	Yes	Yes	Yes	Yes	Yes	Yes	Yes	Yes	Yes	Yes	No	Full Control	Yes	Yes	Python, Java	ZODB, MariaDB, Apache HBase	Free Core GPL, Commercial Enterprise	Yes	Yes	Yes	2018-01-09	6.1.0
ZIS-System	Yes	Yes	Yes	Yes	Yes	Yes	Yes	Yes	Yes	Yes	No	Full Control	Yes	Yes	Windows	MariaDB	Commercial	Yes	Yes	Yes	2020-02-01	5.8
Name	IP SLA Reports	Logical Grouping	Trending	Trend Prediction	Auto Discovery	Agentless	SNMP	Syslog	Plugins	Triggers / Alerts	MIB Compiler	WebApp	Distributed Monitoring	Inventory	Platform	Data Storage Method	License	Maps	Access Control	IPv6	Latest release date	Latest release version

=== Legend ===
Product name
The name of the software, linked to its Wikipedia article.
IP SLAs reports
Support of Cisco's IP Service Level Agreement mechanism.
Logical grouping
Supports arranging the hosts or devices it monitors into user-defined groups.
Trending
Provides trending of network data over time.
Trend prediction
The software features algorithms designed to predict future network statistics.
Auto discovery
The software automatically discovers hosts or network devices it is connected to.
Agentless
The product does not rely on a software agent that must run on hosts it is monitoring, so that data can be pushed back to a central server. "Supported" means that an agent may be used, but is not mandatory. An SNMP daemon does not count as an agent.
SNMP
Able to retrieve and report on SNMP statistics.
Syslog
Able to receive and report on Syslogs.
Plugins
Architecture of the software based on a number of 'plugins' that provide additional functionality.
Triggers / alerts
Capable of detecting threshold violations in network data, and alerting the administrator in some form.
MIB compilter
Able to read MIB data, to quickly understand what resources are being managed.
Web app
Runs as a web-based application.
- No: There is no web-based frontend for this software.
- Viewing: Network data can be viewed in a graphical web-based frontend.
- Acknowledging: Users can interact with the software through the web-based frontend to acknowledge alarms or manipulate other notifications.
- Reporting: Specific reports on network data can be configured by the user and executed through the web-based frontend.
- Full Control: ALL aspects of the product can be controlled through the web-based frontend, including low-level maintenance tasks such as software configuration and upgrades.
Distributed monitoring
Able to leverage more than one server to distribute the load of network monitoring.
Inventory
Keeps a record of hardware and/or software inventory for the hosts and devices it monitors.
Platform
The platform (Coding Language) on which the tool was developed/written.
Data storage method
Main method used to store the network data it monitors.
License
License released under (e.g. GPL, BSD license, etc.).
Maps
Features graphical network maps that represent the hosts and devices it monitors, and the links between them.
Access control
Features user-level security, allowing an administrator to prevent access to certain parts of the product on a per-user or per-role basis.
IPv6
Supports monitoring IPv6 hosts and/or devices, receiving IPv6 data, and running on an IPv6-enabled server. Supports communication using IPv6 to the SNMP agent via an IPv6 address.
