= XorMon =

Infrastructure monitoring tool

- Other names: XorMon NG
- Developer: Xorux s.r.o.
- Release: 11 April 2024; 2 years ago
- Stable release: 2.4.0 / 15 October 2026; 21 days ago
- Written in: TypeScript, JavaScript, Python, Perl
- Operating system: Linux
- Platform: x86-64 and PowerPC
- Type: Network monitoring, infrastructure monitoring
- License: GPL v3
- Website: xormon.com

XorMon Original
- Other names: XorMon
- Developer: Xorux s.r.o.
- Release: 22 October 2020; 6 years ago
- Stable release: 8.0.6 / 27 November 2025; 11 months ago
- Written in: TypeScript, JavaScript, Python, Perl
- Operating system: Linux
- Platform: x86-64 and PowerPC
- Type: Network monitoring, infrastructure monitoring
- License: GPL v3
- Website: original.xormon.com

XorMon is an open-source IT infrastructure monitoring tool developed by the Czech software company Xorux. It is designed to monitor performance and health across various IT layers, including servers, storage, SAN, LAN, databases, and cloud environments. The software is also provides specialized monitoring for IBM i and AIX, alongside standard platforms like VMware and Linux.

XorMon serves as a unified successor to the company's previous monitoring tools, LPAR2RRD and STOR2RRD, combining their functionalities into a single interface.

== History ==
Xorux was founded in Prague in October 2013 by Pavel Hampl, a former IBM system administrator. The company's original tools, LPAR2RRD and STOR2RRD, relied on RRDtool (Round Robin Database) for data storage and graphing.

XorMon was first introduced in October 2020 and later in March 2021 alongside LPAR2RRD version 7.10. The original version acted as a unified front-end user interface that sat on top of existing LPAR2RRD and STOR2RRD instances. This allowed users to view data from both tools in a single dashboard while relying on the legacy backends.

In April 2024, Xorux developed a complete rewrite of the software also known as XorMon NG. XorMon NG uses a modern technology stack, replacing RRDtool with TimescaleDB for data storage, and introduces a microservices architecture.

Version 2.0 was released in October 2025.

== Features ==
XorMon provides full-stack monitoring capabilities, collecting performance metrics from hardware and software vendors. It is frequently adopted by Managed Service Providers (MSPs) who need to manage diverse fleets of systems.

- Multi-vendor support: The tool supports technologies including VMware, Microsoft Hyper-V, Nutanix, Oracle Database, and cloud platforms like AWS and Microsoft Azure. It maintains strong support for IBM legacy systems, offering detailed metrics for IBM i (AS/400) ASPs, LPARs, and AIX.
- Topology: XorMon includes a visualization feature that maps the relationships between virtualization layers, physical servers, SAN switches, and storage arrays, allowing administrators to trace connectivity and performance bottlenecks.
- Interactive graphs: The interface uses JavaScript libraries to provide interactive charts that allow zooming and filtering, a departure from the static images of previous versions.
- Backup monitoring: Recent versions monitor backup jobs and status for platforms like Veeam, Veritas, and IBM Storage Protect.

== Architecture and deployment ==
XorMon is built on an open-source stack designed for scalability:

- Front end: React.js and Plotly.js
- Back end: Node.js, NestJS, and Python
- Database: TimescaleDB (based on PostgreSQL)

The software is typically deployed as a pre-configured virtual appliance (OVA) or as a Docker container.

== See also ==
- LPAR2RRD
- STOR2RRD
- Network monitoring
- System administration
- Comparison of network monitoring systems
- IBM Power Systems
