= Hobbit (disambiguation) =

A Hobbit is a fictional creature created by the author J. R. R. Tolkien.

Hobbit or The Hobbit may also refer to:

- The Hobbit, a 1937 novel by J. R. R. Tolkien

== Arts, entertainment, and media ==
=== Films ===
- The Hobbit (1967 film), short Czech animation
- The Hobbit (1977 film), animated made-for-TV film
- The Hobbit (1985 film), film shot in USSR
- The Hobbit (film series), a three-part film adaptation of the novel The Hobbit
  - The Hobbit: An Unexpected Journey (2012), the first film in The Hobbit trilogy
  - The Hobbit: The Desolation of Smaug (2013), the second film in The Hobbit trilogy
  - The Hobbit: The Battle of the Five Armies (2014), the third film in The Hobbit trilogy

=== Video games ===
- The Hobbit (1982 video game), an adventure game
- The Hobbit (2003 video game), a platform game
- Lego The Hobbit (video game), a Lego action-adventure game

=== Television ===
- Hobitit, a Finnish Television series based on The Lord of the Rings

=== Other uses in arts, entertainment, and media ===
- Adaptations of The Hobbit
- Music of The Hobbit film series, soundtracks by Howard Shore
- "The Hobbit" (South Park), a 2013 episode of South Park

== Brands and enterprises ==
- Hobbit, a brand of cookies manufactured by Bahlsen
- Honda PA50 or Honda Hobbit, a moped
- The Hobbit, Southampton, a pub

== Computing ==
- Hobbit (computer), a Soviet home computer, based on the ZX Spectrum
- Hobbit (software) or Xymon
- AT&T Hobbit, an experimental microprocessor design

== Science ==
- Homo floresiensis, dwarf archaic human species formerly native to the island of Flores, Indonesia
- Syconycteris hobbit or moss-forest blossom bat

== Other uses ==
- Hobbit (unit), a unit of volume or weight formerly used in Wales
- Hobbit (word), a folklore creature (class of spirit) of North England

== See also ==
- Halfling
- HOBET, Health Occupations Basic Entrance Test
