= RRD =

RRD may refer to

- Rejimen Renjer DiRaja, the Malaysian Army Royal Ranger Regiment
- Reti Radiotelevisive Digitali
- Rolls-Royce Deutschland
- Round-Robin Database
- RR Donnelley, a printing and communications company based in Chicago, Illinois
- Regimental Reconnaissance Detachment

== See also ==
- RRDtool, Unix / free software "round-robin database"
  - RRD Editor, GUI based / free software RRDtool data editor
- SEPTA Regional Rail Division
