= Op5 Monitor =

Computer system and network monitoring application software

OP5 AB
- Company type: Network monitoring Server Monitoring
- Industry: Computer Software
- Founded: January 1, 2004
- Headquarters: Stockholm, Sweden
- Products: OP5 Monitor Free, OP5 Monitor Pro, OP5 Monitor Enterprise+
- Services: Consulting, Training
- Website: itrsgroup.com

OP5 Monitor is a software product for server, Network monitoring and management based on the open-source project Naemon, is further developed and supported by OP5 AB. OP5 Monitor displays the status, health and performance of the IT network being monitored and has an integrated log server, OP5 Logger. The company sells downloadable software that monitor, visualize and troubleshoot IT environments and collect information both from hardware, software, virtual and/or cloud based services.

== History ==
The company was founded in 2004 by Jan Josephson and Fredrik Åkerström in Stockholm, Sweden. The company was conceived to create an IT monitoring solution that can handle a large IT environment.

The company was acquired in August of 2018 and is now a subsidiary of ITRS Group.

== Management Packs ==
Management packs are containers of pre-defined monitoring metrics. Users can create own packs and set their own standard on how to monitor a specific device within the network. They are available for Generic servers, DNS servers, Standalone VMware ESXi virtualization hosts, Web servers with HTTPS, Web server.json, and Windows server

== OP5 Monitor Extensions ==
The OP5 extensions are a set of products that provides specific functionality to increase control. Add-ons for op5 Monitor is typically developed by partners or other software developing companies for extending or integrating op5 Monitor. They include:

- JIMO integration add-on for JIRA: Two-way communication between OP5 Monitor and JIRA. Add-on developed by Mogul
- NetApp monitoring add-on: Monitor NetApp systems
- Bischeck add-on: An open-source project providing monitoring of applications and processes with dynamic behavior

== Awards and recognition ==
OP5 has been mentioned in news and has received several awards, such as Cool Vendor by Gartner 2010

== See also ==
- Comparison of network monitoring systems
- Pandora FMS An alternative to OP5
