= Isyvmon =

isyVmon was a computer system and network monitoring software application system created by iT-CUBE SYSTEMS. It was designed to monitor and track the status of various applications, network services, servers, and other network hardware.

== Overview ==
isyVmon was based on the Open Source Software Nagios and Centreon licensed under the GNU GPL V3.

Special features:

- monitoring hosts, networks, applications & business processes
- ready-to-run distribution
- real-time exploitation and management frontends
- Web2.0 GUI, dashboards, alerting, databases, reporting, administration
- prebuilt content inclusive templates and plugins
- extended status-map
- integration of extensions
- scalability through single or distributed deployment
- encrypted communication between core and satellites
- freeware edition is limited up to ten hosts
- virtual and hardware appliance, vmware ready

== History ==
=== 2013 ===
   no further development

=== 2012 (isyVmon v3.0) ===
   isyVmon „Full Discovery (ANH)“ (Freeware / Enterprise Edition)
   Enhancements of isyVmon „Simple Discovery (ADI)“ (Freeware / Enterprise Edition)
   More than 300 Bugs fixed in the isyVmon Monitoring GUI (Freeware / Enterprise Edition)
   Simplified Setup for ESX(i) Monitoring (Freeware / Enterprise Edition)
   Improvements of the isyVmon worker (Freeware / Enterprise Edition)
   Improvements of the Commandline API (Freeware / Enterprise Edition)
   Simplified getting Support for isyVmon (Freeware / Enterprise Edition)
   Tactical Overview - Dashboard improvements (Freeware / Enterprise Edition)
   Scheduled periodic downtimes available (Freeware / Enterprise Edition)
   Secure LDAP (TLS) support (Freeware / Enterprise Edition)

=== 2011 (isyVmon v2.4) ===
   Auto Discovery (ADI) (also available in Freeware Edition)
   Advanced Notification (ANO) released (Enterprise Edition only)
   Extended Status Map (ESM) v3.0 (also available in Freeware Edition)
   Android/iPhone APP turns from "technical preview" to "beta" state

=== 2011 (isyVmon v2.2) ===
   introduced connection for splunk ( www.splunk.com) and isyVmon
   introduced several new features you asked for (SMS, license GUI, Satellite GUI, and many more)
   many enhancements in usability and functionality based on customer projects.
   focus on even more scalability and stability.
   participated vmware ready process.

=== 2010 (isyVmon v2.0) ===
   isyVmon's first world open public release.
   complete new product website with community based support (KB, Forum, Downloads, ...)
   introduced isyVmon Standalone as a freeware edition.
   major focus on scalability and stability.
   integration of many enhancements from customer projects.
   based on complete new development framework.

=== 2009 (isyVmon v1.5 - v1.6) ===
   isyVmon's first official release.
   increased development and big steps in the integration of features based on customer needs.
   partnership with merethis - the company behind centreon.
   opened distributed monitoring for the public version.
   integrated upgrade function in isyVmon.

=== 2008 (isyVmon v1.0) ===
   the idea of isyVmon was born and introduced based on the 2007 created standardized toolkit.
   increased development depending on customer needs.
   started to use a complete development framework based on VMware toolkits.
   several projects with major focus at distributed monitoring.
   development of an upgrade function in isyVmon.
   first virtual appliance version.

=== 2007 (monitoring toolkit v0.1 - v0.8) ===
   evaluated all (relevant) available monitoring tools because nagios interface and handling was very unhandy
   starting to use centreon at top of nagios.
   first versions of a standardized toolkit for customers.
   first implementations of the standardized toolkit in larger environments.

== See also ==
- Comparison of network monitoring systems
- Nagios
