= STOR =

STOR may refer to:

- Short Term Operating Reserve, see National Grid Reserve Service
- STØR, American furniture chain
- STOR2RRD, an open-source software tool

== See also ==
- JSTOR, digital library
- Stor (born 1987), Swedish rapper
- Stör, a river in Schleswig-Holstein, Germany
- Stör (Elde), a river in Mecklenburg-Vorpommern, Germany
- Sontaran Commander Stor, fictional character in the Doctor Who sci-fi episode, "The Invasion of Time"
