= Netdisco =

- Developer(s): Community headed by Oliver Gorwits
- Initial release: May 2003
- Stable release: 2.079001 (2.79) / September 13, 2024; 6 months ago
- Repository: github.com/netdisco/netdisco
- Written in: perl, JavaScript
- Operating system: Unix-like
- Type: Network monitoring, network management
- License: BSD license
- Website: netdisco.org

Netdisco is a network management tool suitable for small to very large networks. IP address and MAC address data is collected into a PostgreSQL database using SNMP, CLI, or device APIs. It allows network administrators to locate the exact switch port of any node connected to the network.

== Details ==
Netdisco utilizes SNMP to fetch ARP tables from routers and MAC tables from layer 2 switches. If Cisco Discovery Protocol, Link Layer Discovery Protocol, Foundry Discovery Protocol or SynOptics Network Management Protocol is available, discovery of the network topology is mostly automatic. In case the above-mentioned protocols are not enabled (for example due to incompatibilities between the network devices or for security reasons) the topology can be defined manually. A record is maintained of the IP addresses and ports each node has used.

Although written primarily in Perl, and distributed through CPAN, recent work includes interfaces to Python.

== History ==
Netdisco was created at the University of California, Santa Cruz (UCSC), Networking and Technology Services (NTS) department in 2003 by Max Baker, with significant contributions from Mark Boolootian and Jim Warner (through whose ideas Netdisco was born and shaped), Bill Fenner, and Eric Miller. In 2011 a major rewrite was completed by Oliver Gorwits and this remains the current version under active development.

== See also ==
- OSI layer
- Computer network
- Comparison of network monitoring systems
