= NetXMS =

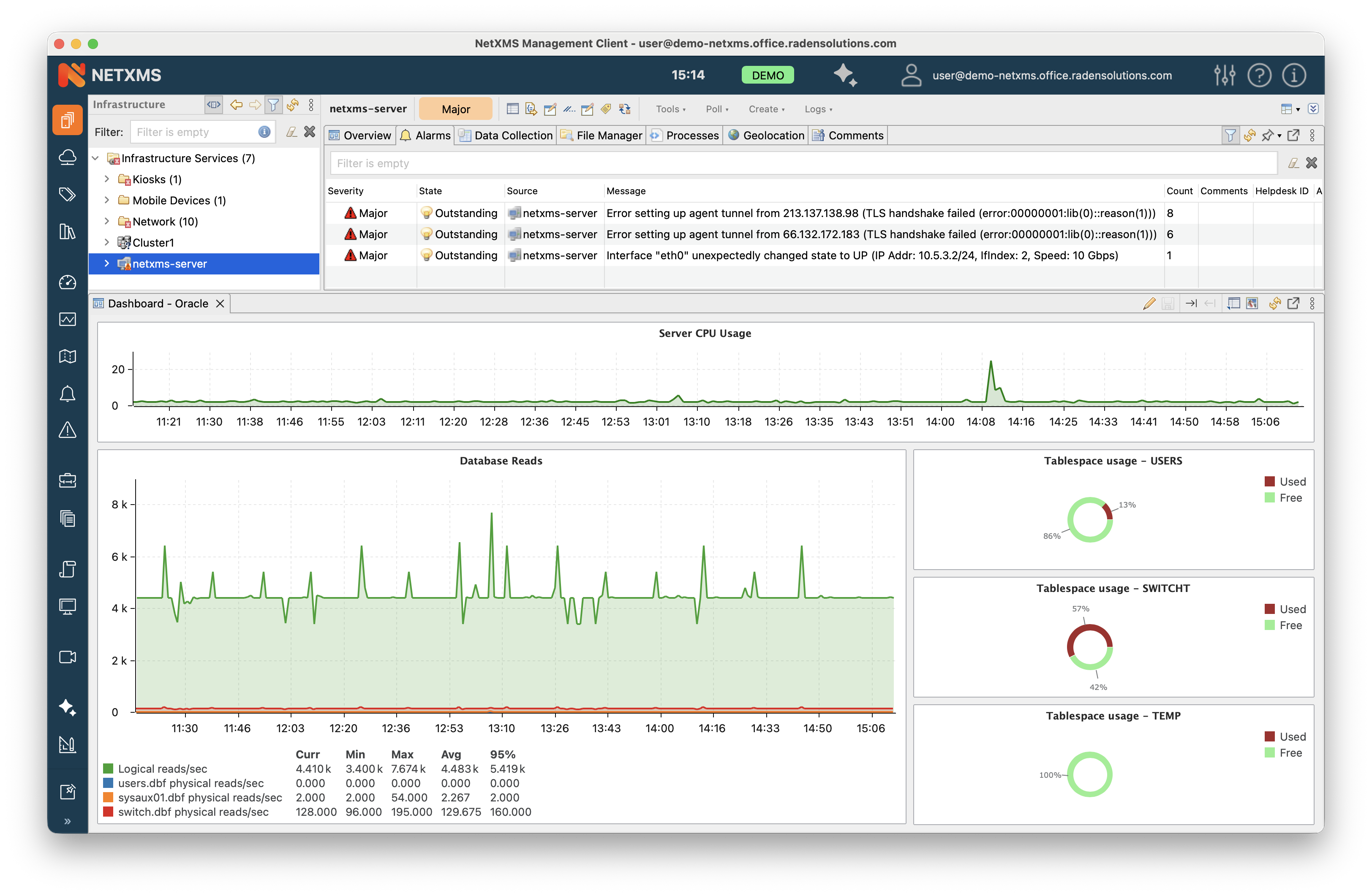
- Screenshot of the NetXMS Windows Console
- Original authors: Victor Kirhenshtein, Alex Kirhenshtein
- Release: December 2, 2004; 21 years ago
- Stable release: 6.2.3 / August 10, 2026; 6 days ago
- Written in: C, C++, Java
- Operating system: Unix-like, Windows 7 and later, macOS
- Type: Network monitoring
- License: GNU General Public License
- Website: netxms.com
- Repository: https://github.com/netxms/netxms

NetXMS is an multi-platform open-source network management system. It can be used for monitoring entire IT infrastructures, starting with SNMP-capable hardware (such as switches and routers) and ending with applications on servers.

Victor Kirhenshtein and Alex Kirhenshtein are the original authors and current maintainers of NetXMS. NetXMS runs natively on Windows, Linux, and other Unix variants. It is licensed under the GNU General Public License version 2 as published by the Free Software Foundation.

== Overview ==
NetXMS features include:

- Monitoring of network devices, servers and applications from one management server
- Data collection either from SNMP-capable platforms or from native NetXMS agent
- Configuration, administration and monitoring functions are accessible through multiplatform (Eclipse-based) and Web GUIs
- The ability to send e-mails and SMS notifications or execute external programs as a reaction to any event, enables users to receive warning notifications based on collected values
- The ability to organize monitored objects into hierarchical structure to represent service dependencies
- Centralized remote agent upgrades
- OSI Layer 2 and Layer 3 IP topology automatic discovery
- Portable client library (C and Java APIs)
- Flexible policy-based event processing (including correlation rules)
- Remote actions
- Flexible access control configuration
- Built-in scripting engine for advanced automation and management

== Project milestones ==
Notable project milestones include:

- October 2004: 0.1.4 is a first public release
- August 2005: 0.2.3 added event correlation support based on IP topology
- January 2006: 0.2.9 introduced built-in scripting language NXSL
- December 2008: 0.2.23 added Java API
- July 2009: 0.2.27 added support for SNMPv3
- February 2010: 1.0.0 released
- May 2011: 1.1.1 introduced dashboards and zoning
- September 2011: 1.1.4 introduced mobile client for Android
- April 2012: 1.2.0 introduced Web GUI with desktop GUI look and feel
- January 2013: 1.2.5 added support for mobile device monitoring and introduced an agent for Android

== See also ==
- Network monitoring
- Comparison of network monitoring systems
