= Big Brother (software) =

Defunct monitoring software

- Original author: Sean MacGuire
- Developers: Sean MacGuire, Robert-Andre Croteau
- Release: November 1996
- Stable release: 4.60 / December 13, 2011
- Operating system: Unix; Linux; Windows
- Type: Network monitoring
- License: Commercial
- Website: http://www.bb4.com/ at the Wayback Machine (archived 2013-08-07)

Big Brother (alias BB) was a tool for systems and network monitoring, generally used by system administrators. The advent of the dynamic web page allowed Big Brother to be one of the first monitoring systems to use the web as its user interface. Prior to this, monitoring tools were generally console based, or required graphic terminals such as X Window to operate. Big Brother produces HTML pages containing a simple matrix of hosts and tests with red and green dots to denote system status. Big Brother was named after George Orwell's character Big Brother from his novel Nineteen Eighty-Four. E-mail from Big Brother originated from the Ministry of Truth, and users of the software were called Brothers.

The application was designed to allow non-technical users to understand system and network status information through a simple interface and presentation, using a matrix to display status information for overhead displays in Network Operations Centers (NOCs). It was designed to monitor computer systems and networks, and for this reason does not use SNMP natively, instead using a client–server model and its own network communication protocol. Clients send status information over port TCP port 1984 (possibly a reference to the novel 1984) at five-minute intervals. Since the clients only send information to a specific monitoring server, its creators claim it is more secure than SNMP-based protocols, which poll clients for information. For this reason, Big Brother was featured at SANS Institute security conferences in 1998. 1999, and at a SANSFIRE conference in 2001.

Big Brother has also been cited in a number of books on system administration, computer security, and networking. The application supports redundancy via multiple displays, as well as failover. Network elements can be tested from multiple locations and users can write custom tests.

An open-source version of the project exists: between 2002 and 2004 it was called bbgen toolkit, between 2005 and 2008 it was called Hobbit, but to avoid breach of trademark, it was renamed Xymon which is still in development and use.

== Background ==
Sean MacGuire wrote Big Brother in 1996 after he received what he believed to be an overpriced quote for network-monitoring software. He introduced it in an article for Sys Admin magazine in October 1996. In August 1997, it was mentioned in an article by Paul Sittler in Linux Journal Shortly after the initial release, Robert-Andre Croteau joined MacGuire and added notification rules, which he described in a Sys Admin article published in September 1998, and created the Windows version.

In 1999 MacGuire and Croteau started the company BB4 Technologies, to commercialize Big Brother. They licensed the product under what they called the "Better than Free" or BTF license - "better" because 10% of the license fee went to the charity of the purchaser's choice.

In 2001 Quest Software acquired BB4 Technologies. MacGuire and Croteau, the only employees of BB4, later went to work at Quest Software and continued to work on the product. The Big Brother Professional Edition (BBPE) was released shortly thereafter. In January 2012, MacGuire left Quest software and is no longer associated with the product he created. Quest Software was acquired by Dell in 2012 to form Dell Software. In June 2016, Dell announced the sale of their software division, including the Quest business, to Francisco Partners and Elliott Management Corporation. On October 31, 2016, the sale was finalized. On November 1, 2016, the sale of Dell Software to Francisco Partners and Elliott Management was completed and the company re-launched as Quest Software.

== Versions ==
There are two versions of Big Brother available — the BTF version (source-code visible), and the pre-compiled, fully commercial, professionally supported Big Brother Professional Edition (BBPE). In 2009, they released the "Big Brother — Modern Edition", an Adobe Flash-based display for Big Brother, and formally added graphing and trend monitoring support.

== Testing ==
- Network services — Any TCP network service can be tested for availability, including (ICMP (Ping), HTTP, POP3, SMTP, FTP, SSH)
- System Information including (processor 5-minute load average, disk usage, messages critical) on all versions of UNIX, Linux and Windows operating systems, via native clients.
- SNMP tests and traps are supported natively.
- Custom tests, generally as bash scripts, although other languages such as Perl are supported.
