= Data Cap Integrity Act =

Proposed telecom legislation in 2012

The Data Cap Integrity Act, also called the Data Measurement Integrity Act, is a bill introduced in the United States Senate by Senator Ron Wyden. The bill would require Internet service providers that have bandwidth caps to only apply caps on service to reduce network congestion rather than discourage Internet use, count all data usage equally toward caps, regardless of its source or content, and use a standard method of metering data use, which is to be defined by the Federal Communications Commission (FCC). The FCC would also be required to provide software to allow users to monitor their bandwidth usage.

== Related ==
Comparison of network monitoring systems
