= Network management software =

Network management software is software used to provision, discover, monitor, and maintain computer networks.

== Purpose ==
With the expansion of the World Wide Web and the Internet, computer networks have grown increasingly large and complex, making manual management impractical. Network management software collects information about network devices (nodes) using protocols such as SNMP, ICMP, and CDP. This data is presented to network administrators to help identify and resolve faults, performance bottlenecks, compliance issues, and similar problems. Advanced systems may remediate certain issues automatically. Network management software also supports provisioning tasks such as installing and configuring new nodes, and maintenance tasks such as upgrading device software and creating virtual networks.

== Functions ==
Network provisioning: Automates the setup and configuration of new network devices, reducing deployment time and eliminating manual errors. Provisioning workflows often use templates, predefined role configurations, and zero touch provisioning to scale across large environments.

Network mapping (discovery): Identifies nodes, connectivity, vendor types, capabilities, and performance characteristics of a target network. Discovery mechanisms rely on protocols such as LLDP, CDP, and SNMP to build and maintain an up to date topology map.

Monitoring: Periodically polls devices or receives asynchronous alerts (e.g., SNMP Traps) to detect faults, misconfiguration, performance bottlenecks, intrusions, and other issues. Monitoring platforms typically provide dashboards, threshold based alerts, and long term trend analysis for capacity planning.

Configuration management: Ensures that network device configurations match desired baselines and detects configuration drift. Configuration management often relies on a network source of truth, a centralized database that maintains an authoritative record of devices, IP addresses, cables, circuits, and other infrastructure assets. These platforms enable change planning, impact analysis, and audit trails by providing a single reference point for automation and operations teams. Notable implementations include NetBox, Obelinf and Device42.

Regulatory compliance: Verifies that the network meets applicable legal and regulatory standards such as PCI DSS, HIPAA, or GDPR. Compliance features include automated audits, policy enforcement, and report generation for internal and external reviewers.

Change control: Enacts changes in a controlled, coordinated manner, producing audit trails useful for forensic investigation after a network intrusion. Change control workflows typically include request, review, approval, scheduling, and post implementation verification.

Software asset management: Inventories installed software, versions, and install dates; supports software deployment and patch management. License tracking and renewal forecasting help organizations maintain compliance and optimize spending.

Cybersecurity: Correlates node data to identify security risks across the IT environment. Features include anomaly detection, vulnerability scanning, and integration with security information and event management systems.

== See also ==
- Comparison of network monitoring systems
- Simple Network Management Protocol
- Data center infrastructure management
- IP address management
- Configuration management database
