= USU =

USU or Usu may refer to:

- Swiss Student Union
- Universal Student Unionism (Australia)
- Unseptunium, a hypothetical chemical element with symbol Usu
- Usu (mortar), a Japanese mortar

== Universities ==
- Universidade Santa Úrsula (Brazil)
- Utah State University (Logan, Utah)
- Ulyanovsk State University (Ulyanovsk, Russia)
- Uniformed Services University
- University of Sydney Union
- Ural State University aka Ural A.M. Gorky State University (Russia)
- United States University
- Uttarakhand Sanskrit University, a state university in Uttarakhand, India
- University of North Sumatra in Medan, Indonesia

== Places ==
- Mount Usu, a volcanic mountain in Hokkaido, Japan
- Ushu, a mainland city that supplied the city of Tyre, called in the Amarna Letters Usu
- Wusu, a city in Xinjiang, China
- Francisco B. Reyes Airport, serving Coron and Busuanga Island, Palawan Province, Philippines (IATA code USU)

== Computers ==
- USU Software, a German software and IT business
