= OpenEDR =

Open-source initiative

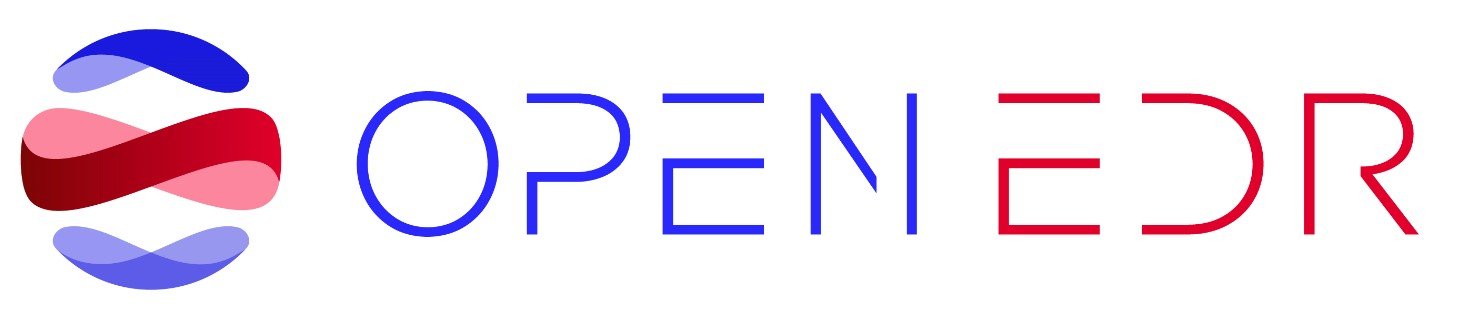
- Type: Open Source
- Industry: Computer software
- Headquarters: United States
- Area served: Worldwide
- Website: www.openedr.com

OpenEDR is an open-source initiative started by Xcitium. OpenEDR is a platform that analyzes at base-security-event level and generates reports for IT staff members.

The source code is open source and available on GitHub. It was last updated in March 2023.

== Components ==
- Runtime components
- System Monitor
- File-system mini-filter
- Low-level process monitoring component
- Low-level registry monitoring component
- Self-protection provider
- Network monitor
