= VoCore =

Single-board Linux computer

- Developer: Qin Wei, Tong Wu and Thomas Hommers
- Type: Single-board computer
- Released: October 2014
- Introductory price: US$20
- Operating system: OpenWrt
- CPU: 360 MHz RT5350F MIPS 24KEc
- Memory: 32 MB, 133 MHz SDRAM
- Storage: 8 MB or 16 MB SPI
- Power: 5 V, 200 mA (WiFi enabled); 120 mA (WiFi disabled)
- Dimensions: 25.4 mm × 25.4 mm × 3.4 mm (1.00 in × 1.00 in × 0.13 in)
- Website: vocore.io

VoCore2
- Type: Single-board computer
- Introductory price: US$3.99 (Lite) & US$11.99
- Operating system: OpenWrt or LEDE
- CPU: 580 MHz MT7688AN (Lite) & MT7628AN
- Memory: 64 MB (Lite), 128 MB, 166 MHz DDR2
- Storage: 8 MB (Lite) or 16 MB, supports SDXC up to 2TB
- Power: 5 V, 200 mA (WiFi full speed); 74 mA (WiFi standby)
- Dimensions: 25.6 mm × 25.6 mm × 3 mm (1.01 in × 1.01 in × 0.12 in)
- Website: vocore.io

The VoCore is "a coin-sized Linux computer with wifi". It is a single-board computer developed in China. It includes WiFi (2.4 GHz 802.11 b/g/n), Ethernet (10/100 Mbit/s x2), USB 2.0 (up to 480M) and 28 GPIO (reused).

It is entirely open source. Both the hardware and the software are available on the VoCore website.
