= God Is My Co-Pilot =

God Is My Co-Pilot may refer to:

- God Is My Co-Pilot (book), a 1943 memoir by Gen. Robert Lee Scott Jr., USAF (ret)
  - God Is My Co-Pilot (film), a 1945 film based on the above book
- God Is My Co-Pilot (band), a band from New York City

== See also ==
- Co-pilot (disambiguation)
