= RRA =

RRA can refer to:

- Arrow-Pratt measure of relative risk-aversion
- Radioreceptor assay, a test to determine the binding affinity of a radioactive-labelled substance to its receptor
- Rahanweyn Resistance Army, also known as the Reewin Resistance Army, an armed faction in Somalia
- Russell Reynolds Associates, a global executive-search, and leadership and succession consulting firm.
- Rail America Inc., NYSE ticker code RRA
- Rapid Rural Appraisal, a term for Participatory rural appraisal
- Reiulf Ramstad Arkitekter, a Norwegian architecture and design studio in Oslo
- Revenue Reconciliation Act of 1993, US tax reform legislation
- Round Robin Archive, a database term used by the RRD Editor
- Red Ribbon Army, a fictional military organization that appears in the Dragon Ball metaseries
- Road Records Association, a British cycle racing organisation
- Rock River Arms, an American firearms manufacturing company
- Internal Revenue Service Restructuring and Reform Act of 1998
- Rural Reconstruction Association, a British agricultural group
- Routing and Remote Access, a Microsoft API and server software
- Richardson Racing Automobiles, a defunct British racing car constructor
- Religious Research Association, an association of researchers and religious professionals
