= KBM =

KBM may refer to:

- KBM, an abbreviation of Konstruktorskoye Byuro Mashynostroyenia - Design Bureau of Machine-Building (Конструкторське Бюро з Машинобудування or КБМ)
  - KB Mashinostroyeniya, or KBM, a Russian defence enterprise, scientific and design R&D centre specialised in missile systems
  - KhKBM, abbreviation of Kharkiv Morozov Machine Building Design Bureau
  - TsKBM, abbreviation of NPO Mashinostroyeniya, a rocket design bureau
- Kyle Busch Motorsports, an American professional stock car racing team
- KBM-7 cells, a chronic myelogenous leukemia (CML) cell line used for biomedical research
- KBM Banka, an earlier name of Direktna Banka, a Serbian bank
- OpenKBM, a set of computer software for systems management of applications that use knowledge management techniques
- KBM, Jewish Law, a section of Library of Congress Classification:Class K -- Law
- KBM, the IATA code for Kabwum Airport (ICAO code AYKB) at Kabwum, Papua New Guinea
- Commissie tot Bescherming van de Maatschappij (KBM), Belgium
