= PA Server Monitor =

Network monitoring software

- Developer: Power Admin LLC
- Release: 2002; 24 years ago
- Written in: C++, C#
- Operating system: Windows
- Available in: English, German, Spanish, French, Portuguese, Dutch, Italian, Japanese, Simplified Chinese
- Type: Network monitoring
- Website: www.poweradmin.com/products/server-monitoring/

PA Server Monitor is a server and network monitoring software from Power Admin LLC. PA Server Monitor focuses primarily on server and network health through numerous resource checks, reports, and alerting options. The agentless, on-premises software can monitor thousands of devices from a single installation. The monitored devices can be desktop computers, servers, routers and other devices.

The main function of the software is to monitor performance of servers and network devices in Windows and Linux environments. Data is kept on customers servers, not stored in the cloud. An agentless monitoring software to watch ping, CPU, memory, disk, SNMP + traps, events, with available historical reports. Apps are available for iOS and Android.

== History ==
Power Admin LLC is a privately held company founded by IT professionals, located in Shawnee, Kansas, outside of downtown Kansas City, Missouri area. Power Admin has been providing professional grade system monitoring products since 1992 for all types of business from SMBs to Fortune 500 companies.

Power Admin also developed two other popular utilities that are used all over the world.

PAExec allows a user to launch Windows programs on remote Windows computers without needing to install software on the remote computer first. This was written as an alternative to Microsoft's PsExec tool (originally by SysInternals's Mark Russinovich), because it could not be redistributed, and sensitive command-line options like username and passwords were sent as clear text. Source code is readily available on GitHub.

Power Admin also developed SpeedFanHttpAgent. The SpeedFan HTTP Agent exports and allows you to access SpeedFan's (utility by Alfredo Milani Comparetti) temperature data from across the network via a simple HTTP request.

== What it Does ==
PA Server Monitor monitors event logs, disk space, running services, web page content, SNMP object values, log files, processes, ping response time, directory quotas, changed files and directories. Equipped to monitor thousands of servers/devices from a single installation, and more via satellite monitoring services.

It has extensive reporting to get status reports for servers/devices, group summaries, uptime and historical stats, providing actions and alerts by customizable email, SMS and other types of notifications, and suppression and escalation of certain notifications. It can also automatically restart services and run custom scripts.

Other capabilities include satellite monitoring of remote offices/locations across firewalls and/or across the internet without a VPN, agentless server monitoring and a bulk config feature to speed changes across many servers/devices.

Alerts in PA Server Monitor can use event suppression to cut down on false alerts, event deduplication system to further remove noise, and event escalation to give alerts increasing visibility as a problem persists for longer. Alert Reminders can also be used to make sure problems don't get forgotten about.

== Device Support ==
PA Server Monitor is Windows-based, and many monitors use standard Microsoft Windows APIs (mostly based on Microsoft RPC). Standard protocols such as SNMP (including Traps), Syslog, IPMI, HTTPS, FTP, various mail protocols, SSH, etc. allows for monitoring non-Windows devices.

== Architecture ==
PA Server Monitor is made of three main components: the Central Service, the Console and optional Satellite Monitoring Services. Because the product is agentless, nothing gets installed on monitored devices. In addition, since the software is installed on-premises, all data remains on-premises.

=== Central Service ===
The Central Service is the hub of the software. This is where the database is stored for historical reporting and trend analysis, alerts are sent from, and where all configuration is kept. The Central Service contains a web server from which the web interface and reports are viewed.

=== Console ===
The Console application is a native Windows application, and the "single pane of glass" from which all configuration, monitoring and reporting is done. The Console can be installed on multiple workstations, and they all connect to the Central Service through an HTTPS-based API.

=== Satellite Monitoring Service ===
The Satellite Monitoring Service enables remote and distributed monitoring. It is an optional monitoring engine (only available with the Ultra license) that can do all the same monitoring the Central Service can do. This can be installed in the same network as the Central Service to distribute monitoring load, or it can be installed at remote sites for monitoring devices that the Central Service cannot access. Even in the remote site case, all configuration continues to be done through the Console application. The Satellite Monitoring Service also connects to the Central Service through the HTTPS-based API.

=== Automatic Failover ===
An optional second Central Monitoring Server can be installed which will keep track of the status of the main Central Monitoring Server and should it fail, the Failover will automatically take over monitoring duties. Satellite Monitoring Services can automatically switch to the newly active Failover server during this period.

=== Monitors ===
Monitors are the basic function that contains a reference to a resource to be monitored, as well as thresholds to compare against, and a list of actions (alerts) to fire if there are problems. Monitors have several attributes to make them easier to conform to various environments.

== Version History ==
- v.9.5 (2024)
- v.9.4 (2024)
- v.9.3 (2023)
- v.9.2 (2023)
- v.9.1 (2023)
- v.9.0 (2022)
- v.8.5 (2022)
- v.8.4 (2022)
- v.8.3 (2021)
- v.8.2 (2020)
- v.8.0 (2019)
- v.7.2 (2018)
- v.7.0 (2017)
- v.6.3 (2016)
- v.6.0 (2015)
- v.5.6 (2014)
- v.5.2 (2012)
- v.4.0 (2011)
- v.3.7 (2009)
- v.3.6 (2008)
- v.3.4 (2007)
- v.3.3 (2006)
- v.2.2 (2005)
- v.2.0 (2004)
- v.1.0 (First Beta Release (2004))

== See also ==
- Comparison of network monitoring systems
- Computer performance
- Remote administration
- Application performance management
- Website monitoring
- Network management
- System monitor
- Cowart, Robert; Knittel, Brian (2008). Special Edition: Using Microsoft Windows Vista (Second ed.). Que Publishing. ISBN 978-0-7897-3781-6.
