= Zenoss =

American software company

Zenoss Community Edition
- Zenoss running under Linux
- Developer: Zenoss Inc.
- Final release: Zenoss Core 6.3.2 / October 17, 2019; 6 years ago
- Written in: Python 90%, Java 10%
- Type: Network management system
- License: GPLv2
- Website: www.zenoss.com
- Repository: sourceforge.net/p/zenoss/code/

The company Zenoss, Inc. was founded in 2005 and is headquartered in Austin, Texas. The company develops hybrid IT monitoring and analytics software.

Zenoss Community Edition was a free and open-source application, server, and network management platform based on the Zope application server. It provided a web interface that allowed system administrators to monitor availability, inventory/configuration, performance, and events. Originally called Zenoss Core, it was released under the GNU General Public License version 2.

Zenoss, Inc. has discontinued Zenoss Community edition on 17 March 2022, closing its community forum on 31 March 2022.

== History ==
Zenoss Community Edition (formerly known as Zenoss Core) was developed by Zenoss Inc., a software technology company specializing in IT monitoring and Artificial Intelligence for IT Operations (AIOps). The company was co-founded and incorporated in November 2005 in Austin, Texas by Bill Karpovich (CEO) and Erik Dahl (CTO), two former employees of USinternetworking (USi). As TechCrunch notes, "Dahl had started developing some ideas for an open source IT management system in 2002 after he left USi... The first version of Zenoss Core was released in 2006 and the company raised a $4.8 million series A lead [sic] by Boulder Ventures and Intersouth Partners. The commercial product followed in 2007."

Later, the company opened a satellite office in Coventry, the United Kingdom to expand its presence in the European technology markets.

While Zenoss Community Edition is still maintained by Zenoss Inc., the company switched its focus on other commercial products such as Zenoss Cloud (SaaS infrastructure for IT environments) and Zenoss Service Dynamics (IT monitoring software), among others. The company mainly operates in the domain of full-stack monitoring analytics software and AIOps in North America, EMEA and other regions.

The company changed the name of the product from Zenoss Core to Zenoss Community Edition circa 2018 with the new 6.2.1 release. As of 2022, it is both supported by Zenoss Inc. and the Zenoss User Community. Since 2014, Greg Stock has been serving as the company's CEO.

== Technology overview ==
Zenoss combines original programming and several open source projects to integrate data storage and data collection processes with a web-based user interface.

Zenoss is built upon the open-source software technologies such as:

- Zope Application server: An object-oriented web server written in Python.
- Python: Extensible programming language.
- Net-SNMP: Monitoring protocol that collects systems status information.
- RRDtool: Graph and log time series data.
- MySQL: A popular open source database.
- Twisted: An event-driven networking engine written in Python.
- Lucene: A full text search library written in Java.
- OpenTSDB: Time series database (from Zenoss Core 5).
- Docker (software): Container virtualization (from Zenoss Core 5).
- D3.js: Interactive graphic Javascript library (from Zenoss Core 5).

Zenoss provides the following capabilities:

- Monitoring availability of network devices using SNMP, SSH, WMI
- Monitoring of network services (HTTP, POP3, NNTP, SNMP, FTP)
- Monitoring of host resources (processor, disk usage) on most network operating systems.
- Time-series performance monitoring of devices
- Extended Microsoft Windows monitoring via WS-Management and Zenoss open source extensions
- Event management tools to annotate system alerts
- Automatically discovers network resources and changes in network configuration
- Alerting system provides notifications based on rule sets and on-call calendars
- Supports Nagios plug-in format

=== Platform ===
Zenoss Inc. lists the following operating systems for Zenoss Core on their download page:

Zenoss versions 5.1 support:

- Red Hat Enterprise Linux / CentOS (7)
- Centos (7)

Zenoss version 4.2 support:

- Red Hat Enterprise Linux / CentOS (5, 6)
- Centos (5, 6)
- Ubuntu (via community build script)

A web-based portal provides operating system agnostic access to configuration and administration functions. Chrome, Firefox, and Internet Explorer/Edge are supported.

=== ZenPacks ===
ZenPacks provide a plug-in architecture that allows community members to extend Zenoss's functionality. The authors are free to choose how they license their individual ZenPacks. ZenPacks are encapsulated in Python eggs and provide instrumentation and reports for monitored infrastructure components. Currently there are over 400 ZenPacks available for various versions of Zenoss.

=== Enterprise ===
The enterprise version builds on the core version by providing commercial support and additional features, such as synthetic web transactions and global dashboards. "In the enterprise edition," writes Sean Michael Kerner, "Zenoss is adding something it calls end-user experience monitoring which is intended to more accurately simulate end-user application activity." Kerner continues, "Enterprise users also get certified application monitors specifically geared for Microsoft SQL and Exchange."

== Related products ==
Zenoss competes with other open source and proprietary enterprise systems management products. Open source systems management products are available from GroundWork Inc., Hyperic and Opsview. In an interview with Jack Loftus of SearchEnterpriseLinux.com, Bill Karpovich explains what makes Zenoss different:

"Companies like GroundWork are similar to the Red Hat approach, where a company gathers up the pieces and puts support behind it. Our approach is we have always had the code and we are in control of its roadmap and indemnification. The Hyperic model is where a company comes from a commercial background and makes some of the code open source."

=== Industry reviews ===
In a Network Computing review, Jeff Ballard singles out the Zenoss Core 2.0 user interface and event management system as highlights. Of the event management system, Ballard says, "By aggregating all events through a single rules-processing engine, Zenoss Core eliminates duplication, making for a manageable user interface."

In his review, Ballard finds the installation troubling. "Unfortunately, getting started was challenging as Zenoss provided no context-sensitive help to guide us through a truly staggering number of configuration options."

In the "Clear Choice Tests" Network World reviewer Barry Nance offers the following praise for Zenoss Core 2, "Even more impressive than its discovery of our network is its remediation features, which can automatically execute start or stop operations for a Windows service, for example." Nance's review finds that "Zenoss Core doesn’t support as many diverse devices as HP OpenView or Argent Extended Technologies, nor does it monitor Microsoft Exchange or SQL Server as closely as a commercial tool does."

SYS-CON Media awards Zenoss Core the 2007 Enterprise Open Source Reader's choice award for best Linux systems management software. Reader choice awards are nominated and voted on by the community of Enterprise Open Source Magazine readers.

== Books ==
Title	Author	Publisher	Date	Length	ISBN
Zenoss Core 3.x Network and System Monitoring	Michael Badger	Packt	May 2011	312 (first edition)	978-1-84951-158-2
A step-by-step guide to configuring, using, and adapting Zenoss Core 3.
Zenoss Core: Network and System Monitoring	Michael Badger	Packt	June 2008	261 pp (first edition)	978-1-84719-428-2
A step-by-step guide to configuring, using, and adapting this free Open Source network monitoring system.

== See also ==
- Comparison of network monitoring systems

== Notes ==
- Ballard, Jeff. "Rollout: Zenoss Core". Network Computing.
- Hinkle, Mark (2007-07-19). "Zenoss Enterprise Edition 2.0 is here". Zenoss Blog: No Node Left Behind. Archived from the original on 2009-01-06.
- Linux News Desk (2007-07-02). "SYS-Con Announces 2007 Linux and Enterprise Open Source Reader's Choice Awards". SYS-CON. Archived from the original on 2008-07-19.
- Loftus, Jack (2007-03-30). "Zenoss takes on IBM, HP systems management". SearchEnterpriseLinux.com. Archived from the original on 2007-06-08.
- Kerner, Sean Michael (2007-07-19). "Zenoss Aims for the Enterprise".
- "Open Management Consortium". Archived from the original on 2007-06-23.
- "Zenoss".
- Nance, Barry (2007-06-18). "Zenoss Core: Clear Choice Tests". Network World.
