= FreeNATS =

- Original author(s): David Cutting
- Developer(s): PurplePixie Systems
- Initial release: March 2, 2008
- Stable release: 1.20.1b / November 14, 2018; 6 years ago
- Operating system: Unix-like
- Platform: PHP / MySQL
- Available in: English
- Type: Network monitoring
- License: GNU General Public License
- Website: www.purplepixie.org/freenats/

FreeNATS (the Free Network Automatic Testing System) is an open-source network monitoring software application developed by David Cutting under the banner of PurplePixie Systems.

FreeNATS is free software licensed under the terms of the GNU General Public License version 3 as published by the Free Software Foundation.

== Overview ==
- Monitoring of network services (SMTP, POP3, HTTP, ICMP (ping)
- Limited monitoring of host resources (processor load, disk usage) on a majority of network operating systems, including Microsoft Windows and Linux through agent-based testing
- Plugin design that allows users to easily develop their own service checks depending on needs, by using PHP (or other languages or scripts wrapped in PHP)
- Some ability to define network host hierarchy using "master" nodes allowing link failures to suspend monitoring
- Event-based system allowing failure notifications to be sent in customised email (suitable for email-to-SMS) or to utilise third-party notification scripts via a plug-in
- Ability to define event handlers to be run during service or host events for proactive problem resolution
- Automatic data retention cleanups
- Full web-interface for management and monitoring
- Ability to "publish" views and graphs within third-party web pages

== See also ==
- Comparison of network monitoring systems
