= Paessler PRTG =

Network monitoring software

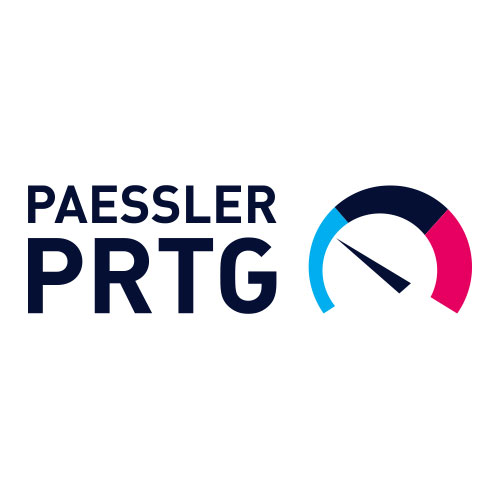
- Paessler PRTG Logo
- Developer: Paessler GmbH
- Release: 2003; 23 years ago
- Stable release: 26.2.120.1449 / June 3, 2026; 30 days ago
- Written in: Delphi
- Operating system: Windows, Linux, macOS
- Available in: English, German, Spanish, French, Portuguese, Dutch, Russian, Japanese, Simplified Chinese
- Type: Network monitoring
- Website: www.paessler.com/prtg

PRTG (Paessler Router Traffic Grapher ) is a network monitoring software developed by Paessler GmbH. It monitors system conditions like bandwidth usage or uptime and collects statistics from miscellaneous hosts such as switches, routers, servers, and other devices and applications.

It was initially released on May 29, 2003 by the German company Paessler GmbH which was founded by Dirk Paessler in 2001.

The software is available in three versions: a classic standalone solution (PRTG Network Monitor), one for large and distributed networks (PRTG Enterprise Monitor) and a SaaS-version (PRTG Hosted Monitor).

== Specifications ==
The software has an auto-discovery mode that scans predefined areas of an enterprise network and creates a device list from this data. Further information on the detected devices can be retrieved using communication protocols like ICMP, SNMP, WMI, NetFlow, jFlow, sFlow, DCOM or the RESTful API.

=== Sensors ===
The software is based on sensors, e.g. HTTP, SMTP/POP3 (e-mail) application sensors and hardware-specific sensors for switches, routers and servers. The software has over 200 different predefined sensors that retrieve statistics from the monitored instances, e.g. response times, processor, memory, database information, temperature or system status.

=== Web interface and desktop client ===
The software can be operated via an AJAX-based web interface which is suitable for both real-time troubleshooting and data exchange with non-technical staff via maps (dashboards) and user-defined reports. An additional administration interface in the form of a desktop application for Windows, Linux, and macOS is available.

=== Notifications, reports and price model ===
In addition to the usual communication channels such as Email and SMS, notification is also provided via an app for iOS or Android. The software also provides customizable reports and its price model is based on sensors.

== See also ==
- Comparison of network monitoring systems

== Literature ==
- Andrés, Steven, Brian Kenyon, and Erik Pack Birkholz. Security Sage's guide to hardening the network infrastructure. Elsevier, 2004.
- Elsayed, Abdellatief, and Nashwa Abdelbaki. "Performance evaluation and comparison of the top market virtualization hypervisors." Computer Engineering & Systems (ICCES), 2013 8th International Conference on. IEEE, 2013.
