= Performance Co-Pilot =

Open-source tool for monitoring multiple computer systems

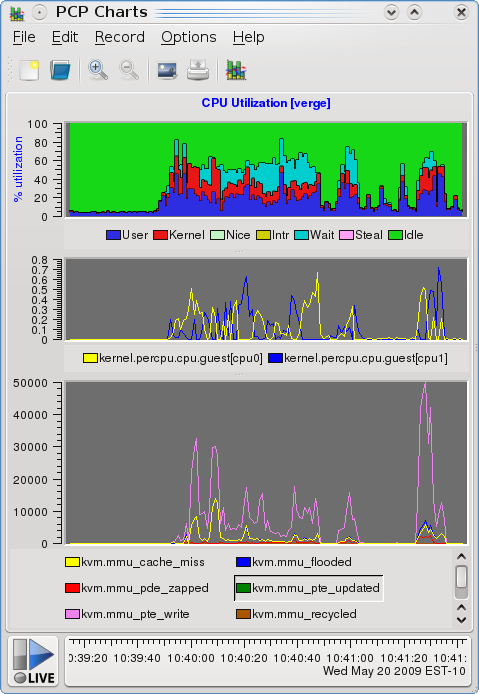
- Screenshot of PCP Charts monitoring a KVM server
- Original author: Ken McDonell
- Initial release: April 1995
- Stable release: 7.1.0 / January 28, 2026
- Operating system: Unix-like, Windows, Mac OS X
- Type: Network monitoring
- License: GNU Lesser General Public License, GNU General Public License
- Website: www.pcp.io
- Repository: github.com/performancecopilot/pcp

Performance Co-Pilot (also known as PCP) is an open source software infrastructure for monitoring, visualizing, recording, responding to, and controlling the status, activity, and performance of networks, computers, applications, and servers.

== Features ==
The following features are provided by the Performance Co-Pilot:

- Runs on many Unix/Linux variants, as well as Windows and Mac OS X.
- Has a fully distributed architecture; any client may interact with any instrumented server or application.
- Has a plug-in architecture for instrumenting any custom application or server.
- Can query hundreds of operational measurements from operating systems, Apache, Sendmail, MySQL, the Java VM, VMware, KVM, etc.
- Can send operational parameters to remote processes, to change their behavior (cf. computational steering).
- Can query or send any type of value, including: integers, strings, floating point numbers, and arbitrary composite data structures.
- Has a communication protocol designed to minimize consumption of network bandwidth.

== History ==
Performance Co-Pilot was originally created by Silicon Graphics (SGI) as a proprietary software product, exclusively for SGI customers. PCP's initial design was done at SGI in Melbourne, Australia, by Ken McDonell and Mark Goodwin, starting in October 1993. The pair were joined by Seppo Keronen and Jonathan Knispel, early in 1994. These four produced the initial version of Performance Co-Pilot 1.0, which was released in April 1995 as add-on software for SGI's IRIX operating system. Components included in that initial release were: pmcd (Ken and Jonathan), pmchart (Mark), libpcp (Ken), pmie (Seppo), pmgadgets (Jonathan), and a host of other smaller bits and pieces. Other significant early contributors were Ania Bodeit, David Chatterton (pmview), Ivan Rayner, Nathan Scott and Tim Shimmin.

In 2000, the core of PCP was re-released as free software, under the GNU LGPL. Additional proprietary components have been re-released as free software since then.

Currently an active community of contributors is enhancing the open source distribution of PCP and releasing new tools built upon it.

Netflix built Vector.io which used PCP. This has been modified to being a Grafana data source which will be integrated into mainline PCP.

== See also ==
- Comparison of network monitoring systems
- OpenLMI, which includes PCP monitoring agent
