= Dorado Software =

Information technology company

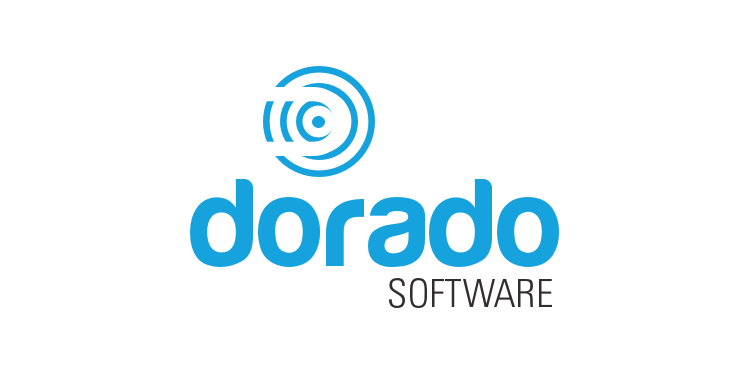
- Type: Private company
- Industry: Operations Support Systems
- Founded: 1998
- Headquarters: El Dorado Hills, California
- Products: Cruz product suite
- Services: development licensing network management software
- Website: www.doradosoftware.com

Dorado Software is a multinational information technology company specializing in the development, licensing, and support of network management software. Dorado develops and maintains the Cruz product suite, which provides infrastructure and service lifecycle management for heterogeneous and multi-technology environments.

== Cruz ==
Dorado's Cruz product suite combines a range of management functions in a single console and also automates the deployment and management of network devices including routers, switches, PCs, servers, storage and security appliances. Cruz product features include automated configuration, change management, monitoring the health and performance of assets, trend reporting, network traffic analysis, service provisioning, and managed service provider features.

Dorado has an OEM relationship with other companies such as Dell and CommTelNS that private-label or embed its technology. Notably, Cruz serves as the basis for Open Manage Network Manager which is sold by Dell EMC as a means of managing their various lines of switches and/or network equipment from other vendors such as Cisco Systems, Juniper Networks, etc.

== History ==
Dorado was founded in 1998 in El Dorado Hills, California as a provider of application development environments for OEM element management systems (EMS). The company used this experience to build a multi-vendor management system that evolved into the suite of Cruz products.

In October 2025, Dorado Software entered into a strategic partnership with Goldilock Secure, a NATO-backed cybersecurity company known for its hardware-based physical network isolation technology. Under the agreement, Dorado Software acts as both a technology partner and reseller, integrating its orchestration platform with Goldilock Secure’s solutions to enhance resilience, compliance, and secure connectivity for critical infrastructure and enterprise networks at scale.

== See also ==
- Communications service provider
- Infrastructure management services
