= Co-pilot (disambiguation) =

Co-pilot refers to the first officer (civil aviation), also known as the second pilot (sometimes referred to as the "co-pilot") of an aircraft.

Co-pilot or copilot may also refer to:

- Co-pilot Glacier, a short, steep tributary glacier in Victoria Land, New Zealand
- Copilot Music and Sound, a New York-based music content and strategy company
- "Co-Pilot" (song), song by Kristina Maria featuring Laza Morgan and Corneille
- GitHub Copilot, an artificial intelligence tool for code completion and automatic programming
- Microsoft Copilot, a generative artificial intelligence chatbot
- Newark Co-Pilots, earlier minor league baseball team based in Newark, New York
- Performance Co-Pilot, also known as PCP, an open source tool for monitoring computer networks
