= WiFiDog Captive Portal =

WiFiDog was an open source embeddable captive portal solution used to build wireless hotspots. It is no longer an active project after not being updated for several years.

WiFiDog consists of two components: the gateway and the authentication server. It was written by the technical team of Île Sans Fil and is included in the software package repository of OpenWrt.

== Gateway ==
The WiFiDog gateway is written in C with no dependencies beyond the Linux kernel. This structure enables it to be embedded in devices such as the WRT54G router running OpenWrt, FreeWRT or DD-WRT or most PCs running Linux. Linux Journal reports that a working gateway install can be packaged in less than 15kB on an i386 platform.

== Authentication server ==
The WiFiDog authentication server is a PHP and PostgreSQL or MySQL server based solution written to authenticate clients in a captive portal environment. WiFiDog Auth provides portal specific content management, allows users to create wireless internet access accounts using email access, provides gateway uptime statistics and connection specific and user log statistics.
