= STOR2RRD =

Open-source software

- Developer: XoruX
- Initial release: 2013
- Stable release: 7.30 / 25 October 2021; 4 years ago
- License: GNU General Public License v3.0
- Website: stor2rrd.com

STOR2RRD is an open-source software tool that is used for monitoring and reporting performance in storage systems, SAN switches, and LAN switches. It is developed by the Czech company XoruX.

== Overview ==
STOR2RRD is open-source software that is published under the GNU General Public License v3.0. As of November 2021, the latest version is 7.30. Beta versions were initially made available in 2013. Version 1.00 was released in October 2014.

Besides storage systems, it can also be used to monitor SAN and LAN switches. STOR2RRD generates historical utilization graphs for these systems.

The software is compatible with various systems by Dell, EMC, Hitachi, HPE, IBM, NetApp, Synology, and others. It is also integrated with various storage systems, including Tatlin.Unified.

== See also ==
- LPAR2RRD
- XorMon
