= LPAR2RRD =

- Developer: XoruX
- Initial release: 2006
- Stable release: 7.40 / 5 April 2022; 3 years ago
- License: GNU General Public License v3.0
- Website: lpar2rrd.com

LPAR2RRD is an open-source software tool that is used for monitoring and reporting performance of servers, clouds, and databases. It is developed by the Czech company XoruX.

== Overview ==
LPAR2RRD is open-source software that is published under the GNU General Public License v3.0. As of April 2022, the latest version is 7.40. The software was first launched in 2006.

The software tool is designed to monitor and report on server virtualization utilizations. It produces utilization graphs, reports, or alerts of physical or virtual servers on CPU, memory, IOPS, and many other depending on specific virtualization platform. It also supports database engines as Oracle Database, PostgreSQL or containerization platforms like OpenShift or Docker. Cloud technologies are supported as well.

The software is compatible with various systems by IBM Power Systems, IBM i, VMware, Nutanix, Oracle VM, Oracle Solaris, oVirt / Red Hat Virtualization, XenServer, Microsoft Hyper-V, Linux, Oracle Database, PostgreSQL Database, Microsoft SQL Server, Amazon Web Services, Microsoft Azure, Google Cloud, Apache CloudStack, Kubernetes, Red Hat OpenShift, Docker, Huawei FusionCompute, and Proxmox.

== See also ==
- STOR2RRD
- XorMon
