= Health Occupations Basic Entrance Test =

The HOBET (Health Occupations Basic Entrance Test) is an entrance exam used in the United States to determine if a person is qualified to enter a health occupation worker.

The HOBET covers the following topics:

Reading

- Paragraph and Passage Comprehension
- Informational Source Comprehension

Mathematics

- Numbers and Operation
- Algebraic Applications
- Data Interpretation
- Measurement

Science

- Human Body Science
- Life Science
- Earth and Physical Science
- Scientific Reasoning

English and Language Usage

- Grammar and Word Meanings in Context
- Spelling and Punctuation
- Structure
