= Diversity charter =

- Created: 2004
- Location: European Union Countries
- Signatories: 16 million
- Subject: Inclusive and diverse workplace
- Purpose: Inclusivity, combating discrimination

A diversity charter is a document that outlines an organization's effort to create an inclusive and diverse workplace. It includes a set of principles or commitments involving organizational leadership, executives, and employees. These principles may encompass fostering an inclusive culture, promoting equal opportunities, combating discrimination, and supporting diversity in all its forms, including aspects such as gender, race, ethnicity, age, disability, and sexual orientation. Diversity Charters can vary in different regions or industries, as they may have their own versions with specific goals and commitments.

== History ==
The initial stride towards this document was taken in January 2004 in France, where was signed the first diversity charter in Europe, focusing on workplace diversity. Six years later, in 2010, the diversity charters from various EU nations united to form the EU level exchange Diversity Charter Platform.

=== Signatories in European countries ===
As of 2024, diversity charters have been introduced in 27 EU countries, encompassing Austria, Belgium, Bulgaria, Croatia, Cyprus, Czech Republic, Denmark, Netherlands, Estonia, Finland, France, Germany, Greece, Hungary, Ireland, Italy, Latvia, Lithuania, Luxembourg, Poland, Portugal, Romania, Slovakia, Slovenia, Spain, Malta and Sweden.

== Main pillars ==
A diversity charter, within the context of a workplace or a group of people, is a document that recognizes diverse attributes within a collective of individuals and is founded on six key pillars: race, age, gender (gender diversity), religion, sexual orientation (sexual diversity), and cultural background (cultural diversity).

=== Companies ===
Over 12,800 companies and organizations became signatories of the diversity charter, encompassing a collective workforce of more than 16 million employees. Several companies, including Gucci, Puma, Enel, Pirelli, Ogilvy, Edenred, IKEA, Boehringer Ingelheim, Kotsovolos, and Papastratos, have signed the document, signifying their commitment to promoting diversity in the workplace.
