= USU Software =

German software company

USU Software AG
- Type: Public
- Industry: Computer software, IT & Enterprise Service Management, Knowledge Management, Software Asset Management
- Founded: 1977
- Headquarters: Möglingen, Germany
- Key people: Bernhard Oberschmidt, Chief Executive Officer; Udo Strehl, Chairman of the Supervisory Board
- Revenue: €132.1 million (2023)
- Number of employees: 803
- Website: www.usu.com

USU Software AG is headquartered in Möglingen near Stuttgart, Germany, and serves as the holding company for two IT subsidiaries. USU GmbH operates internationally in the IT management software sector, particularly the digitalisation of IT and customer services. USU Digital Consulting GmbH provides services to support digital transformation within organisations.

In the 2023 financial year, the group generated revenue of €132.1 million with 803 employees and recorded a net profit of €5.3 million. USU Software AG is represented by subsidiaries in Germany, the United States, France, Italy, Japan, Austria, and the Czech Republic.

== Company history ==
=== Founding and early years ===
The company was founded in 1977 by the banker and programmer Udo Strehl as Udo Strehl Unternehmensberatung (USU). In 1988 it began selling software products for IT management and in 1995 these were sold abroad for the first time.

In the following years, the company expanded its business to include knowledge management products and services.

=== IPO and takeovers ===
On 4 July 2000, USU was listed on the stock exchange. At that time, the company already had 170 employees and generated revenue of DM41 million in the 1998/99 financial year. Strehl planned to invest half of the proceeds from the IPO, amounting to DM35 million, in product development and the other half in acquisitions.

The share price of the Neu-Ulm-based company Openshop, which was also listed on the stock exchange on 21 March 2000, plummeted after its founder and CEO Thomas Egner (1962–2001) died in a plane crash in January 2001. Subsequently, in March 2002, Openshop merged with USU AG to form USU-Openshop AG. In 2003, the name was changed to USU Software AG.

Founder Udo Strehl moved to the supervisory board in 2002. In order to expand its product range, USU acquired Omega GmbH in 2005, LeuTek GmbH in 2006 and Aspera GmbH in 2010. With the acquisition of Aspera GmbH, the company claims to have become one of the world's leading providers of IT asset management system software.

In 2012, the USU Group acquired a majority stake in BIG Social Media GmbH, based in Berlin, and founded Aspera Technologies Inc. in Boston. In 2013, USU established a new research division focused on Industrial Big Data. In mid-2015, it acquired SecurIntegration GmbH, based in Cologne, which operated in SAP licence management; this company merged with Aspera GmbH a year later. Since early 2017, UnitB Technology GmbH, an agency for digital media and IT, has also been part of the USU Group. In May 2017, Easytrust SAS became the first French company to be acquired, and at the end of the same year, it was renamed USU SAS, focusing on software asset management and Oracle licence management.

=== Expansion and restructuring ===
In spring 2018, the subsidiary USU AG changed its legal form and has operated as USU GmbH since 28 March. Also in 2018, USU restructured its business areas and established the Unymira division, which focuses on the digitalisation of business processes in service and combined the offerings of the four previously independent USU divisions: BIG Social Media, Business Solutions, KCenter, and UnitB Technology. On 28 January 2021, the group announced that all subsidiaries would be united under the common USU umbrella brand.

To strengthen the distribution of its software applications in Asia, USU founded the company USU GK in Tokyo in autumn 2021. The following year, USU consolidated its IT management offerings into a new cloud portal.

=== Recent developments ===
In April 2023, USU Technology GmbH and USU Solutions GmbH were merged into the sister company USU GmbH.

One year later, in March 2024, the company announced that a delisting was planned; this came into effect on 2 July 2024. On 1 October 2024, Thoma Bravo, a US software investment company, announced the acquisition of a majority stake in the USU product business (USU GmbH).

The consulting business was transferred to USU Digital Consulting GmbH by means of a spin-off. Since January 2026 the company operates under the name puntus GmbH.

In March 2025, USU Software AG acquired Saas management company Saasmetrix.

To expand its international activities in the field of AI-based knowledge management, USU acquired the French provider Mayday SAS in September 2025, which specializes in the use of artificial intelligence in customer service.

== Products and services ==
The product business of USU Software AG is bundled in the subsidiary USU GmbH.

In the IT service management business area, USU supports companies with ITIL-compliant products for strategic and operational IT and enterprise service management. USU's programs enable the digitalisation and automation of all processes necessary for the planning, design, operation, control, use, and billing of services. Analyst firms rank USU as a global market leader in this field.

In the area of IT asset management, the company provides software asset management applications and managed services. This allows customers to manage their IT resources to reduce costs, ensure software compliance, and minimise risks. Global large corporations use these SAM applications to improve their software usage.

The IT monitoring business area includes applications such as event monitoring, end-to-end monitoring, cloud and container monitoring, and IT event management, which monitor the entire IT infrastructure of companies to ensure its functionality.

With FinOps, USU offers services such as cloud cost management for more cost-efficient use of cloud modules, cloud governance for secure management of customer systems, IT financial management for IT cost planning, and SaaS management. Additionally, USU provides AI applications and data-driven services for mechanical and plant engineering.

The Customer Service Knowledge Management segment offers digital applications for knowledge management in organisations' customer service. The USU knowledge base is primarily used in call and service centres. The offering is complemented by self-service options, chatbots, voice bots, and portal services. During the COVID-19 pandemic in Germany, the USU chatbot was used by some municipalities and districts to provide information to citizens. At the end of 2021, USU launched Bot Universe, an open-source project for chatbot networks, which has included ChatGPT since April 2023. A virtual AI assistant was introduced in autumn 2024.

The service business of USU Software AG is located in the subsidiary USU Digital Consulting GmbH. Partners include technology provider Pegasystems and Liferay.

== Research and development ==
USU GmbH's research division deals mostly with cloud- and AI-based technologies and acts as a technology partner or consortium leader for publicly funded research projects, among other things. Since 2022 the company has been developing an AI-supported service platform for German mid-sized businesses, which is being funded by the Federal Ministry for Economic Affairs and Climate Action.

== Sustainability and social engagement ==
In the area of sustainability, USU supports the climate protection project Yuntdag Wind Park north of İzmir on the Turkish Aegean coast by financing the construction of 17 wind turbines, each with a capacity of 2.5 megawatts. The aim is to reduce the annual greenhouse gas emissions resulting from coal power generation.

The company is a signatory of the diversity charter.

== Awards (selection) ==
In 2022 and 2023, USU was included in the Gartner Voice of the Customer report, which evaluates IT products.

- 2020: 1st place in the Software Companies category and awarded the Germany's Most Valuable Companies seal in the study Deutschlandtest by Focus Money
- 2022: 1st place in the overall ranking of the Vendor Selection Matrix market study in the categories Hybrid Cloud Cost Management and Hybrid Cloud Service Management in the aspect of cost control and optimisation by the analysis company Research in Action
- 2023: Named "Strong Performer" in the Enterprise Service Management category by the analysis company Forrester
- 2024: Named "Niche Player" in the SaaS Management Platforms category by the analysis company Gartner
- 2024: Awarded as one of the leading providers in the IT Financial Management and Technology Business Management categories of the Vendor Selection Matrix market study by the analysis company Research in Action
- 2024: Awarded Best ITC Employer by Great Place to Work
- 2024: Named "Strong Performer" in the Knowledge Management Solutions category by the analysis company Forrester
- 2024: Named "Technology Leader" in the Software Asset Management Tools category by the analysis company QKS Group
- 2025: Named "Leader" in the Software Asset Management Solutions category by the analysis company Forrester
