= Xymon =

Network monitoring application

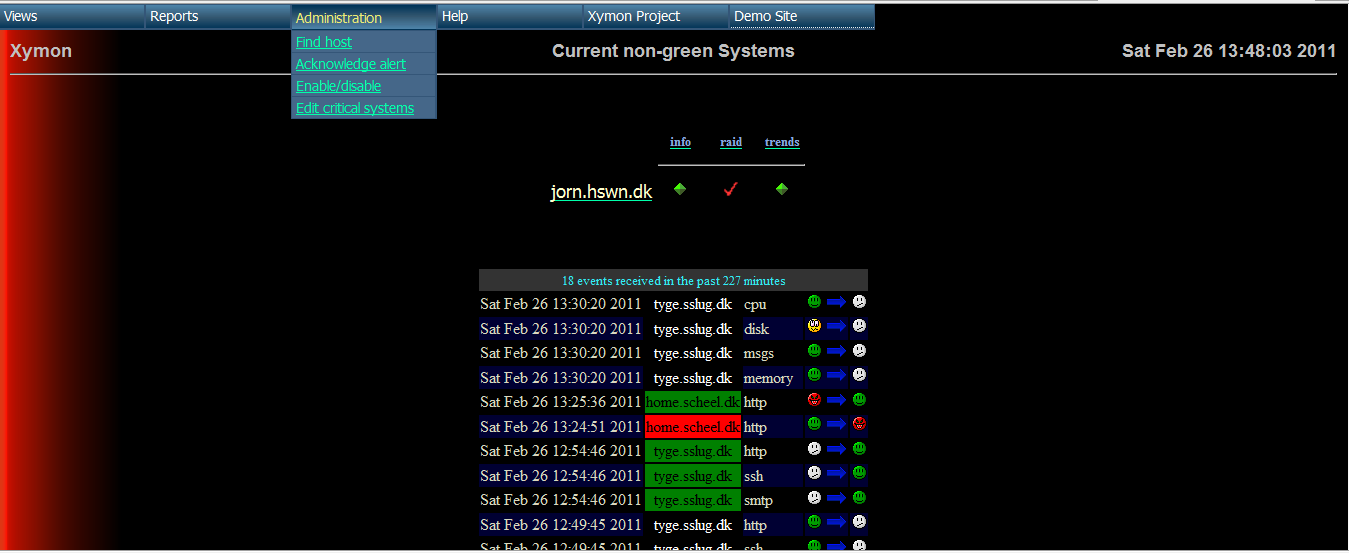
- Software Web Monitoring
- Original author: Henrik Storner
- Developer: Henrik Storner
- Release: March 2005
- Stable release: 4.3.31 / November 6, 2026; 1 day ago
- Operating system: Unix-like
- Type: Network monitoring
- License: GNU GPL 2.0
- Website: xymon.sourceforge.io
- Repository: github.com/xymon-monitoring/xymon

Xymon, a network monitoring application using free software, operates under the GNU General Public License; its central server runs on Unix and Linux hosts.

== History ==
The application was inspired by the open-source version of Big Brother, a network monitoring application, and maintains backward compatibility with it. Between 2002 and 2004 Henrik Storner wrote an open-source software add-on called bbgen toolkit, then in March 2005 a stand-alone version was released called Hobbit. Versions of this were released between 2005 and 2008, but since a prior user of the trademark "Hobbit" existed, the tool was finally renamed Xymon. In January 2012, Quest Software discontinued development of Big Brother.

== Functionality ==
Xymon offers graphical monitoring, showing the status of various network services of each device, as well as a range of application and operating system metrics such as listing the number of mail messages queued after a defined level of downtime. The web-based graphical display uses a red/yellow/green condition icon for each host/test, on top of a colored background indicating the current worst status across all hosts and tests. The user can click on a colored icon to view more specific details and (where available) relevant graphs of metric statistics. Built-in reporting tools include SLA-type reports (availability) and the historical state of services (snapshots). Xymon supports the generation of alarms sent by email, and can also use external tools to send messages via other means (e.g. SMS).

Networked hosts and devices are monitored by a Xymon server using network probes supporting a large and extensible range of protocols, including SMTP, HTTP/S and DNS. Hosts that use a supported operating system can also run a Xymon client (also free software), to additionally collect operating system and application monitoring metrics and report them to the Xymon server. Clients are available for Unix and Linux (in formats including source tarball, RPM and Debian package) from the Xymon download site at SourceForge. Windows hosts can use the Big Brother client for Windows, the BBWin client or the WinPSClient written in the Windows PowerShell scripting language. Plugins extend monitoring to new types of applications and services, and many extension scripts for Big Brother will run unchanged on Xymon.

== See also ==
- Big Brother
- MRTG
- Nagios
