= Prpl Foundation =

Non-profit organization

The prpl Foundation is a non-profit open source software foundation started in 2014 by Imagination Technologies and others to encourage use of the MIPS architecture (and “open to others”), through the promotion of standards and open source software, with a particular focus on equipment for data centers, networking (with a focus on residential gateways), and devices for the Internet of Things.

The Foundation manages projects in specific topic areas via “pWGs” (prpl Working Groups). The organization also collects and disseminates information of interest to its members, including patterns in consumer use of smart devices and security issues. In 2016 the organization released a study, "The prpl Foundation Smart Home Security Report". The group also finds and reports security issues in smart devices.

Members of prpl include: Verizon, Orange, AT&T, SoftAtHome, Vodafone, Broadcom, MaxLinear, and Qualcomm.
