= RRDtool =

Data logging and graphing system for time series data

- Original author: Tobias Oetiker
- Release: 16 July 1999; 27 years ago
- Stable release: 1.10.3 / 25 May 2026; 2 months ago
- Written in: C
- Type: Data logging
- License: GNU General Public License
- Website: oss.oetiker.ch/rrdtool/
- Repository: github.com/oetiker/rrdtool-1.x

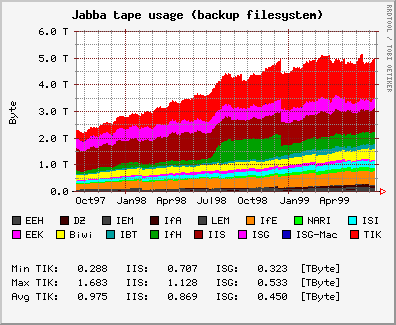
RRDtool has a graph function, which presents data from an RRD in a customizable graphical format.

RRDtool (round-robin database tool) is a data logging and graphing system for time series data such as network bandwidth, temperatures, and CPU load. The data is stored in a circular buffer-based database, thus the system storage footprint remains constant over time.

It also includes tools to extract round-robin data in a graphical format, for which it was originally intended. Bindings exist for several programming languages, including Perl, Python, Ruby, Tcl, PHP and Lua. There is an independent full Java implementation called rrd4j.

== General data storage ==
RRDtool assumes time-variable data in intervals of a certain length. This interval, usually named the step, is specified upon creation of an RRD file and cannot be changed afterwards. Because data may not always be available at just the right time, RRDtool will automatically interpolate any submitted data to fit its internal time steps.

The value for a specific step, after interpolation, is named a primary data point (PDP). Multiple PDPs may be consolidated according to a consolidation function (CF) to form a consolidated data point (CDP). Typical consolidation functions are average, minimum, and maximum.

After the data has been consolidated, the resulting CDP is stored in a round-robin archive (RRA). A round-robin archive stores a fixed number of CDPs and specifies how many PDPs should be consolidated into one CDP and which CF to use. The total time covered by an RRA can be calculated as follows:

time covered = (#CDPs stored) × (#PDPs per CDP) × (step time length)

After this time the archive will "wrap around": the next insertion will overwrite the oldest entry. This behavior is referred to as "round-robin" and is the reason for the program's name.

To cover several timespans and/or use several consolidation functions, an RRD file may contain multiple RRAs. The data retrieval function of RRDtool automatically selects the archive with the highest resolution that still covers the requested timespan. This mechanism is also used by RRDtool's graphing subsystem.

== Release history ==
| Colour | Meaning |
|---|---|
| Red | Release no longer supported |
| Green | Release still supported |
| Blue | Future release |

The following table contains the release history of RRDtool, showing its major releases.

| Version number | Date | Links | Notable changes |
|---|---|---|---|
| 1.0 | 16 July 1999 | Full release notes, Announce | First release. Basically MRTG "done right". |
| 1.2 | 25 April 2005 | Full release notes, Announce | libart; output EPS, PDF & SVG; VDEF; trends; percentiles; updatev; Holt-Winters Forecasting; COMPUTE; .rrd format change. |
| 1.3 | 11 June 2008 | Full release notes, Announce | Safer & faster file access; cairo/pango; anti-aliasing; TEXTALIGN; dashed lines; new HWPREDICT; libxml; i18n; XML dump. |
| 1.4 | 27 October 2009 | Full release notes, Announce | Caching daemon; VDEF PERCENTNAN; CDEF PREDICT & PREDICTSIGMA; libDBI; graph legends positioning; Lua bindings; 3D border width. |
| 1.5 | 16 April 2015 | Full release notes, Announce | Use data from callback functions; population of new rrd files with data from old ones; .NET bindings. |
| 1.6 | 9 May 2016 | Full release notes, Announce | Thread safety. |
| 1.7 | 17 May 2017 | Full release notes | Results of code audit; overhaul of the Python bindings; various other small feature improvements. |
| 1.8 | 13 March 2022 | Full release notes | ROUND function for rrd RPN; vcpkg support for MSVC builds; first_weekday for Windows port; x64 platform for win32 build; --add-jsontime for graphv; --utc flag for graph; automated testing for win32 builds; TUNE command support in rrdcached. |
| 1.9 | 29 July 2024 | Full release notes | Configurable locking. |
| 1.10 | 19 May 2026 | Full release notes | Add Georgian translation; Add -S short option for --step in rrdtool xport; Automated release workflow |

== Other tools that use RRDtool ==
- BackupPC
- Cacti
- Cherokee
- collectd
- Cricket
- Ganglia
- lighttpd
- Lpar2rrd
- Monitorix
- MRTG
- Munin
- Nagios
- Nmon
- NMIS
- ntop
- OpenNMS
- pfSense
- Plesk
- Xymon
- Zenoss Core

== See also ==
- RRD Editor
- Time series database
