= OpenKBM =

OpenKBM is a set of computer software for systems management of applications that use knowledge management techniques (the KBM in OpenKBM stands for Knowledge Based Management).

Originally conceived of and developed as a next generation replacement for Gensym's G2 real-time expert system development platform, the OpenKBM technology and its first layered product, NetCure, were acquired by Rocket Software in 2001 from Gensym Corporation. OpenKBM is used by Rocket and, via OEM agreements, by partners such as IBM and Avaya as the basis for management software applications.

== Components ==
OpenKBM provides:

- Object model for representing the systems to be managed
- Object-oriented hierarchy of monitoring information types such as events, fault, and statistics
- Data acquisition, signal processing, and event processing engines
- Forward chaining event correlation engine
- Knowledge Based Management Language (KBML) for codifying event correlation rules, and signal and event processing logic
- Frameworks for both thick client and web-based graphical user interfaces

== Products ==
- Avaya Visualization Performance & Fault Manager (part of UCM suite)
- NetExpert Neon
- NETMG GoldenTHREAD
- Rocket NetCure Enterprise]
- Rocket NetCure Audit
- Rocket NetCure Discovery
- Mainstar MXI G2 for z/OS
