= RRD Editor =

RRD Editor is a GUI-based application that provides access to archived RRDtool data.

== Features ==
The visual editing features of the RRD Editor allow users to modify the contents of an RRD (Round-Robin Database). Once an RRD is loaded into the editor, users can quickly locate a specific data point to modify or remove an entire Round-Robin Archive (RRA). The tool also allows new data sources and RRAs to be added in addition to detecting and removing spikes.

RRD Editor is licensed under the GNU GPL.

== See also ==
- RRD World - RRDtool Companions
