= Munin (software) =

System monitoring software

- Munin open project logo
- Stable release: 2.0.78 / 20 September 2026; 20 days ago
- Preview release: 2.999.15 / July 8, 2020; 6 years ago
- Written in: Perl
- Operating system: Unix-like
- Type: Monitoring
- License: GNU General Public License version 2
- Website: munin-monitoring.org
- Repository: github.com/munin-monitoring/munin

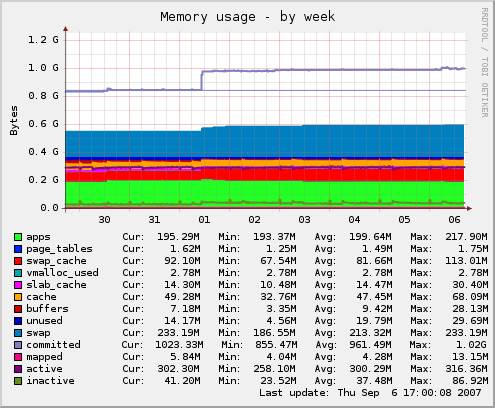
Example graph produced by Munin showing memory usage

Munin is a free and open-source computer system monitoring, network monitoring, and infrastructure monitoring software application.

Munin is written in Perl and uses RRDtool to create graphs, which are accessible over a web interface. Its emphasis is on plug and play capabilities. About 500 monitoring plugins are currently available. It is intended to make it easy to determine "what's different today" when a performance problem happens and to provide visibility into capacity and utilization of resources.

== History ==
Munin was started by Audun Ytterdal and Jimmy Olsen in late 2003, based on RRDtool by Tobi Oetiker. Development has slowed since 2005, but Munin is a stable tool and is still maintained.

“Its name is derived from Norse mythology. One of the two ravens who report the news of the world to the god Odin is called Munin, and the other is named Hugin. Munin is 'memory', and Hugin is 'thought'.”

== Architecture ==
The architecture of Munin is mainly the master–node architecture, comprising one or more Munin nodes and monitoring plugins. The Munin master collects measurements from the nodes, saves the information in Round-Robin Database (RRD) files, creates graphs and can compare collected information against warning and critical thresholds defined in the configuration files.

A Munin node is an agent placed on a host to be monitored. It receives connection from the Munin master and executes monitoring plugins whenever it is called. The Munin master can, by default, communicate with the Munin nodes on TCP port 4949, and a node can have multiple plugins running at the same time.

Plugins are individual programs capable of collecting individual sets of measurements. A plugin typically is given a config request to return data and graph configuration information and a fetch request to return the values currently being displayed. Plugins may be written in various programming or scripting languages and commonly written in Perl or shell.

There are also plugins that can get information via SNMP to enable monitoring of network equipment and other remote systems. The project has both the plugins included with Munin and a separate collection of contributed plugins.

=== Plugins ===
Plugins are the specialized programs that are called by Munin nodes to gather and report current data, and describe how it should be presented. There are over 300 plugins in the core distribution, over 180 plugins in the official third-party contributed repository, and an unknown number of independently published plugins.

They can be written in any programming or scripting language. All they are required to do is print space separated key and value pairs on standard output. This framework makes it trivial to write customized plugins.

== See also ==
- Comparison of network monitoring systems
- LAMP (software bundle)
