= Checkmk =

IT infrastructure monitoring software

- Developers: Checkmk GmbH (previously tribe29 GmbH and Mathias Kettner GmbH)
- Release: 2008; 18 years ago
- Stable release: 2.5 / April 28, 2026; 2 months ago
- Written in: Python, C++
- Operating system: Linux
- Type: IT infrastructure monitoring
- License: GNU GPL v2 and other open-source licenses; Checkmk Enterprise License
- Website: checkmk.com
- Repository: github.com/checkmk/checkmk

Checkmk is an open source IT infrastructure monitoring software system developed in Python and C++. It originated as an extension to Nagios and has since evolved into a self-contained monitoring platform.

Checkmk's server-side component run on Linux, or containerized as a Docker container. Agents (running on entities being monitored) exist for many different operating systems.

The software is available in four editions: an open source edition called Community, self-hosted commercial editions called Pro and Ultimate, and SaaS edition called Cloud. Checkmk Ultimate includes a multi-tenancy option designed for managed services providers.

== History ==
Checkmk originated in 2008 as an agent-substituting shell script for inetd, and was published in April 2009 under the GPL. It was initially built on top of Nagios and added several new components to that system. The open source edition (Checkmk Community) continues to use the Nagios core.

Over time, the commercial editions replaced the core Nagios components with proprietary equivalents, including a custom monitoring core written in C++.

The software was developed by Mathias Kettner GmbH, based in Munich, Germany. In April 2019, the company was renamed tribe29 GmbH, and the product name was changed from "Check_MK" to "Checkmk". In April 2023, the company was renamed again to Checkmk GmbH.

Checkmk GmbH follows an open-core model. Checkmk Community is available under open-source licenses, primarily GPLv2, while the commercial editions are licensed under the proprietary Checkmk Enterprise License.

== Editions ==
Checkmk Community is built on the Nagios monitoring core and is distributed under open-source licenses. The commercial editions — Pro, Cloud, and Ultimate — use a proprietary monitoring core (the Checkmk Microcore, or CMC) written in C++, which is designed to handle configuration changes without a restart and to support short-lived objects such as containers.

The software runs on Linux and is distributed as packages for Debian, Ubuntu, SLES, and Red Hat-based distributions, and as a Docker image.

== See also ==
- Comparison of network monitoring systems
- Grafana
- Icinga
- MRTG
- Naemon
- Nagios
- OpenNMS
- Prometheus
- Zabbix
