= Rafsky =

Rafsky is a surname. Notable people with the surname include:

- Lawrence C. Rafsky, American data scientist, inventor, and entrepreneur
- Robert Rafsky (1945–1993), American writer, publicist, and HIV/AIDS activist

== See also ==
- Friedman Rafsky Test
