= Naemon =

Open-source network and infrastructure monitoring software

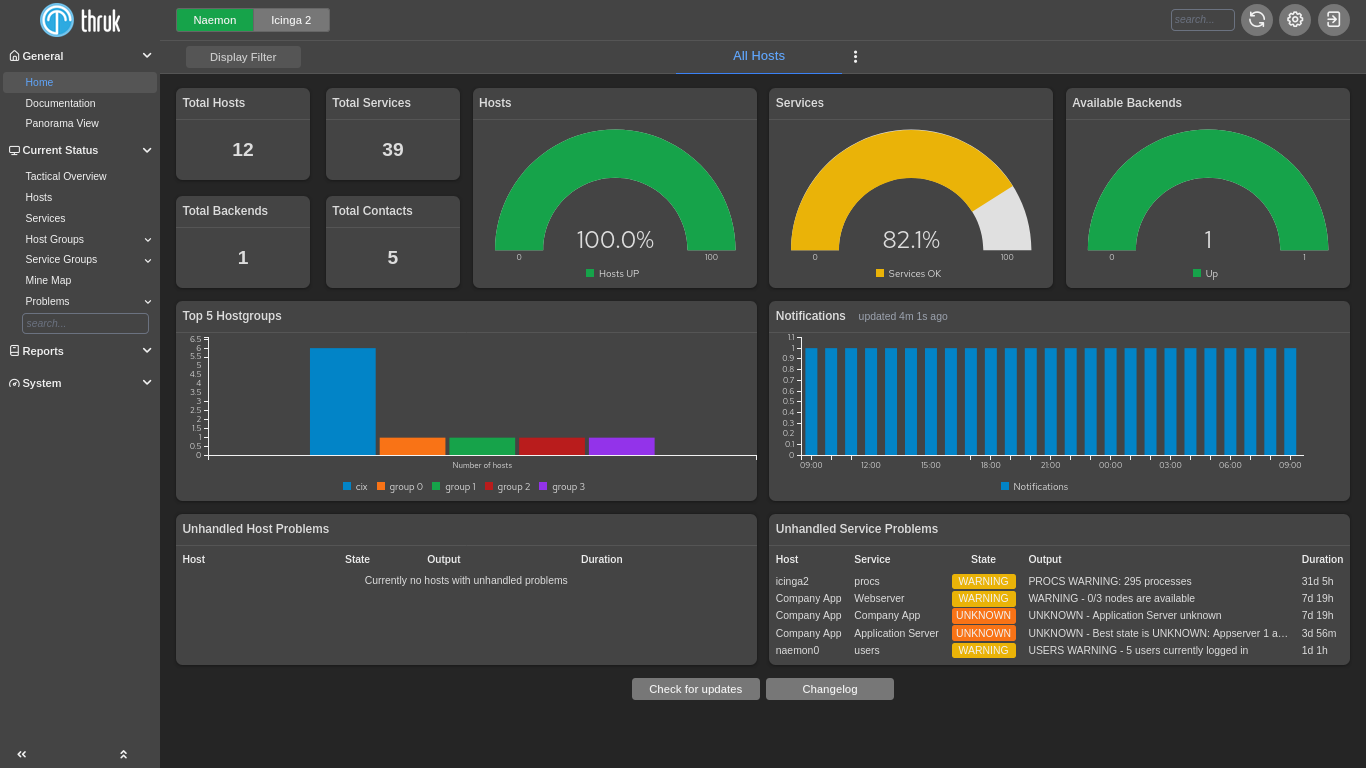
- Screenshot of Thruk 3.22.2, a web interface for Naemon
- Original author: Andreas Ericsson
- Developer: Naemon Development Team
- Initial release: January 29, 2014; 12 years ago
- Stable release: 1.4.2 / January 4, 2024; 2 years ago
- Written in: C
- Operating system: Linux
- Type: Network monitoring
- License: GPLv2
- Website: www.naemon.io

Naemon is an open-source network monitoring and infrastructure monitoring application. It monitors hosts, network services, and system resources, and sends notifications when problems are detected or resolved. Naemon was created in 2014 as a fork of Nagios 4, after several Nagios contributors decided to continue development outside the Nagios project. It is one of several monitoring tools in the Nagios ecosystem, alongside Icinga and Checkmk. The open-source monitoring framework openITCOCKPIT uses Naemon as its monitoring core.

It runs on Linux and is available in packages for Red Hat Enterprise Linux, CentOS, SUSE Linux Enterprise Server, Debian, and Ubuntu.

== History ==
Naemon originated from dissatisfaction with the direction of the Nagios project following the Nagios 4 release cycle. In late 2013, Andreas Ericsson and other contributors announced the fork at the Open Source Monitoring Conference, citing a desire to continue work that had begun in Nagios 4 and to develop outside what they described as an unwelcoming community environment. Ericsson, who had written the bulk of the Nagios 4 codebase, described Naemon's priorities as stability, performance, and extensibility.

The first release, based on Nagios 4.0.2, appeared on January 29, 2014. Naemon 1.4.0 was released in November 2022, and version 1.4.2 followed in January 2024.

Naemon is one of several forks that emerged from the Nagios project during the early 2010s, alongside Icinga (forked 2009) and Shinken (forked 2011).

== Architecture ==
Naemon is written in C and is licensed under version 2 of the GNU General Public License. Its design follows the plugin-based architecture established by Nagios, in which the core daemon schedules and dispatches checks, while external plugins perform the actual tests and return results.

The core daemon monitors network services including SMTP, POP3, and HTTP, as well as host resources such as processor load and disk usage. Checks are dispatched in parallel, which reduces total check latency on large installations. Naemon supports a parent-host hierarchy that allows it to distinguish between hosts that are down and hosts that are unreachable due to an intermediate failure.

When a service or host changes state, Naemon dispatches notifications via configurable methods: email, pager, or any user-defined method implemented as a plugin. Event handlers can be configured to run automatically when state changes occur, enabling automated remediation. Log files are rotated automatically, and the daemon can be deployed in redundant configurations to reduce single points of failure.

The web interface most commonly paired with Naemon is Thruk, a separate open-source project that provides a browser-based dashboard for viewing host and service status, history, and reports.

== See also ==
- Comparison of network monitoring systems
- Nagios – the upstream project from which Naemon was forked
- Icinga – another fork of Nagios
- Checkmk – a related network monitoring system
- Shinken (software) – another Nagios fork
