= K6 =

K6 or K-6 may refer to:

== Locations ==
- K6 (mountain), a mountain in Pakistan
- K6 pipe, a geological formation in Northern Alberta, Canada
- K6, shorthand for ul. Konwiktorska 6, address of the General Kazimierz Sosnkowski Municipal Stadium in Warsaw, Poland

== Transportation ==
- HMS K6, a British submarine
- USS K-6 (SS-37), a 1914 United States Navy K-class submarine
- Ka 6, a glider manufactured by Alexander Schleicher GmbH & Co, Germany
- K6, IATA code used by Air Cambodia
- K 6 (keelboat), sailboat class
- K-6 (1926–1927 Kansas highway), now part of K-9
- K-6 (1927–1958 Kansas highway), now part of US 59
- K-6 (1968–1981 Kansas highway), now K-5
- New Hampshire Avenue–Maryland Line, a Washington Metropolitan Area Transit Authority bus line in suburban Washington, D.C.

== Other uses ==
- K-6 (education), the grades which are traditionally grouped together in American elementary schools; formerly Kindergarten through sixth grade
- K6 machine gun, a 12.7 mm heavy machine gun of South Korea based on M2 Browning
- K-6 (missile), an Indian ballistic missile
- K6 Telephone Kiosk, a type of red telephone box in use the United Kingdom since 1935
- k6 (software), an open-source load testing tool developed by Grafana Labs
- AMD K6, a computer microprocessor
- Sonata in C for Keyboard and Violin, sixth work by Wolfgang Amadeus Mozart according to the Köchel catalogue
- Grushin K-6, a Soviet Air to air missile developed in the 1950s
- Kimber K6S, a revolver

== See also ==
- 6K (disambiguation)
