= Rancid =

Rancid may refer to:

- Rancidification, the oxidation of fats, fatty acids, and edible oils
- Rancid (band), an American punk band, and their eponymous releases:
  - Rancid (EP), the above group's self-titled debut EP released in 1992
  - Rancid (1993 album), their first full-length album
  - Rancid (2000 album), second self-titled album
- Rancid (film), a 2004 Swedish film
- RANCID (software), network management software
- Rancid News, a punk zine also known as Last Hours
