= 6K =

6K, VI-K or 6k may refer to:

- 6K resolution, an image or display resolution
- China Railways Class 6K, a Japanese-built electric locomotive used in China
- Form 6K, a U.S. Securities and Exchange Commission filling
- Stalag VI-K, a former German prisoner of war camp at Stuckenbrock, Germany

and also :

- 6000 (number)
- Inter Airlines IATA airline code
- Asian Spirit IATA airline code
- 6K, the production code for the 1983 Doctor Who serial "The Five Doctors"

== See also ==
- 6000 (disambiguation)
- K6 (disambiguation)
