= TSDB =

TSDB may refer to:

- Terrorist Screening Database
- Time series database
