= Apache IoTDB =

Open Source Database Project

- Developer: Apache Software Foundation
- Stable release: 2.0.2-1 / 21 May 2025
- Written in: Java
- Platform: Cross-platform
- Type: distributed; real-time; time-series; column-oriented data store
- License: Apache License 2.0
- Website: https://iotdb.apache.org/
- Repository: github.com/apache/iotdb

Apache IoTDB is an open-source time series database management system written in Java. It is designed to store, query, and analyze time series data, which is data recorded together with the time at which each value was measured. Such data is commonly generated by Internet of things (IoT) devices, industrial equipment, sensors, and monitoring systems.

The name IoTDB comes from "Internet of Things Database". Apache IoTDB was developed for IoT and industrial internet of things (IIoT) scenarios, where large numbers of devices may produce high-frequency, out-of-order, and continuously growing data. The system supports deployment at the edge or in cloud environments, and includes features for data ingestion, storage, querying, compression, analysis, and machine-learning-based time series analysis.

== History ==
Apache IoTDB is a project initiated by Prof. Jianmin Wang's team in the School of Software at Tsinghua University. In 2011, the team chose to use open source NoSQL technology instead of Oracle for a project with mass machine data management, and noticed the insufficiency of NoSQL in the industrial internet of things (IIoT) scenarios. The team started to develop a data management system and formally proposed TsFile, an optimized columnar compact file storage format for time series data, in March 2016. The source code was then opened on GitHub.

In June 2016, based on TsFile, the team began to develop IoTDB, an IIoT database supporting real-time reading & writing and analysis.

In November 2018, the project IoTDB entered incubator at the Apache Software Foundation (ASF).

On September 16, 2020, the ASF officially issued a resolution to promote Apache IoTDB to the global Top-Level Project (TLP) following a public discussion vote by the community and a show of hands vote by the board.

== Architecture ==
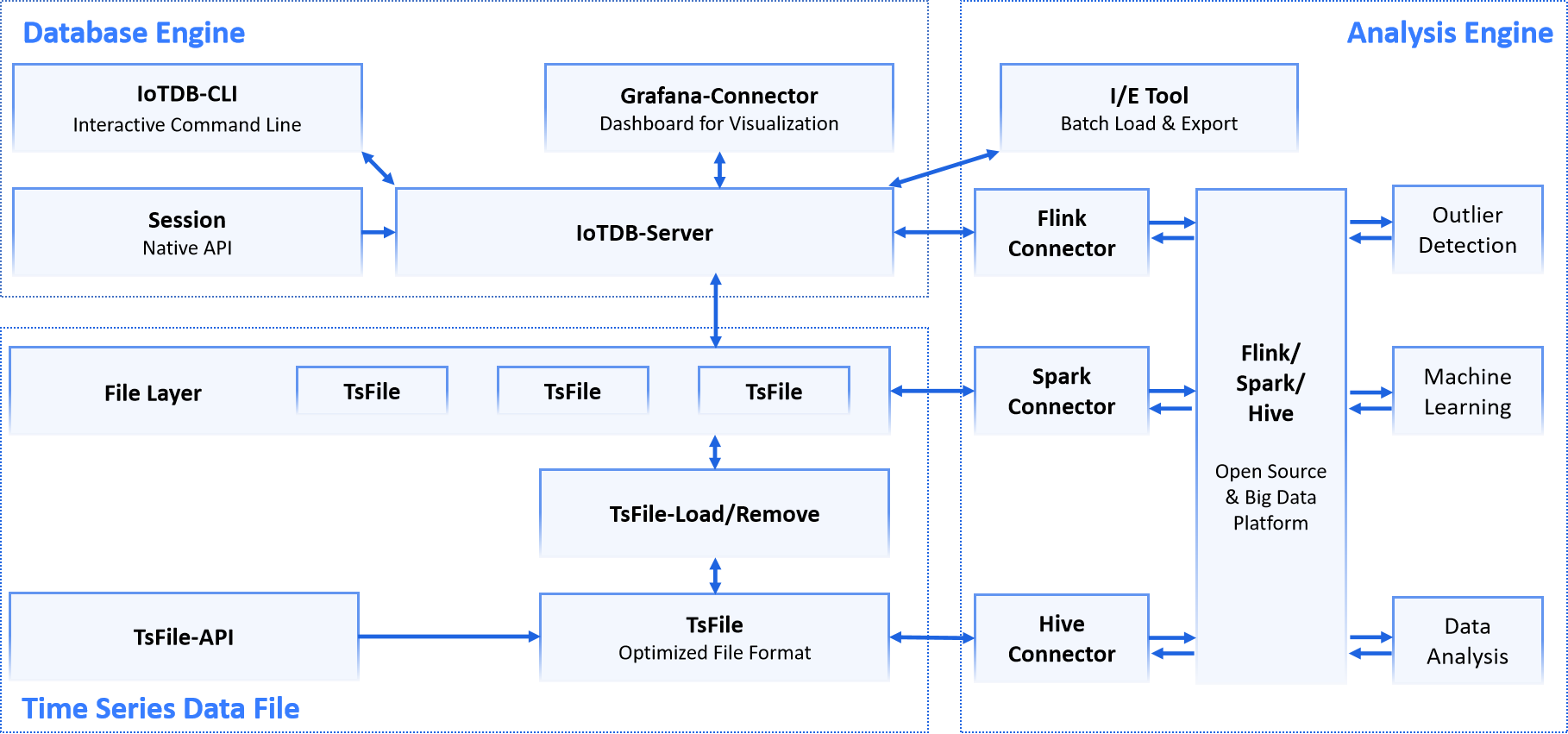
The Architecture of Apache IoTDB

Apache IoTDB can be deployed as a server that receives time series data from applications, devices, sensors, or other data sources. Client tools and application interfaces can be used to write data to IoTDB, query stored data, visualize results, and perform analysis.

In a typical industrial or IoT deployment, data may first be collected close to devices and then synchronized to a central system. IoTDB supports this type of edge-cloud cooperation by synchronizing data between IoTDB instances.

The complete storage system of Apache IoTDB follows a client-server architecture, including IoTDB engine (server) and several components as IoTDB suite (client). IoTDB suite can provide a series of functions in the real situation such as data collection, data writing, data storage, data query, data visualization and data analysis. This allows data collected by the sensor to constantly persist in server, where the data can then be used for native query or shipped to other open-source platforms for data analysis. In particular, IoTDB provides a mode called "Edge-Cloud Cooperation", which can synchronize data collected at every user-configured interval from one IoTDB instance to another using Sync Tool.

Users can use JDBC to write time series data to local/remote IoTDB. This time series data may represent system state data (such as server load and CPU memory, etc.), message queue data, time series data from applications, or other time series data in the database. The data can be directly written to TsFile locally or on Hadoop Distributed File System (HDFS).

TsFile is a column storage file format developed for accessing, compressing and storing time series data in Apache IoTDB. Its structure is based on LSM-Tree, which reduces the computational resources and optimizes the performance of Apache IoTDB.

TsFile could be written to the HDFS, thereby implementing data processing tasks such as abnormality detection and machine learning on the Hadoop or Spark data processing platform.

For the data written to HDFS or local TsFile, users can use TsFile-Hadoop-Connector or TsFile-Spark-Connector to allow Hadoop or Spark to process data. The results of the analysis can be written back to TsFile in the same way. Also, IoTDB and TsFile provide client tools to meet the various needs of users in writing and viewing data in SQL form, script form and graphical form.

== Features ==
Apache IoTDB is designed for scenarios in which many devices generate measurements continuously. Its features focus on flexible deployment, reduced storage usage, high-speed data ingestion, time-based queries, integration with data-processing tools, and machine-learning-based time series analysis.

=== Flexible and cross-platform deployment ===
IoTDB is designed to fit three deployment scenarios: 1) file-based storage or embedded time-series database on edge appliance like Raspberry Pi, 2) standalone TSDB on Industrial PC and 3) distributed TSDB or Hadoop cluster with TsFile. IoTDB provides users a one-click installation tool on the cloud, once-decompressed-used terminal tool and the bridging tool between cloud platforms and terminal tools (Data Synchronization Tool).

=== Low storage cost ===
IoTDB can reach a high compression ratio of disk storage, which means IoTDB can store the same amount of data with less hardware disk cost.

=== AI and machine learning analysis ===
Recent versions of Apache IoTDB include AINode, a component for registering, managing, and invoking time-series-related models. AINode allows users to apply machine learning models to time series data through SQL statements, supporting tasks such as forecasting, missing-value imputation, and anomaly detection.

The Apache IoTDB documentation also describes support for time series large models, including models based on Transformer architectures for time series forecasting, imputation, and anomaly detection. Research on large time series models, such as the Timer model published at the International Conference on Machine Learning in 2024, has explored generative pre-trained Transformer architectures for time series analysis tasks.

=== Efficient directory structure ===
IoTDB supports efficient organization of complex time-series data structures from intelligent networking devices, organization of time-series data from devices of the same type, fuzzy searching strategy for massive and complex directory of time-series data.

=== High-throughput read and write ===
IoTDB supports millions of low-power devices' strong connection data access, high-speed data read and write for intelligent networking devices and mixed devices mentioned above. Currently, IoTDB supports the ingestion rate of up to 30 million data points per second on a single node.

=== Rich query semantics ===
IoTDB supports time alignment for timeseries data across devices and sensors, computation in timeseries field (frequency domain transformation) and rich aggregation function support in time dimension.

=== Easy to get started ===
IoTDB supports SQL-Like language, JDBC standard API and import/export tools which are easy to use.

=== Intense integration with open source ecosystem ===
IoTDB supports Hadoop, Spark, etc. analysis ecosystems and Grafana visualization tool.

== Licensing ==
The Apache 2.0 License is a permissive free software license written by the Apache Software Foundation. It allows end users to modify parts of the original code as long as it contains the appropriate documentation that Apache requires within the redistributed code.
