= Nconf =

Network monitoring configuration software

NConf
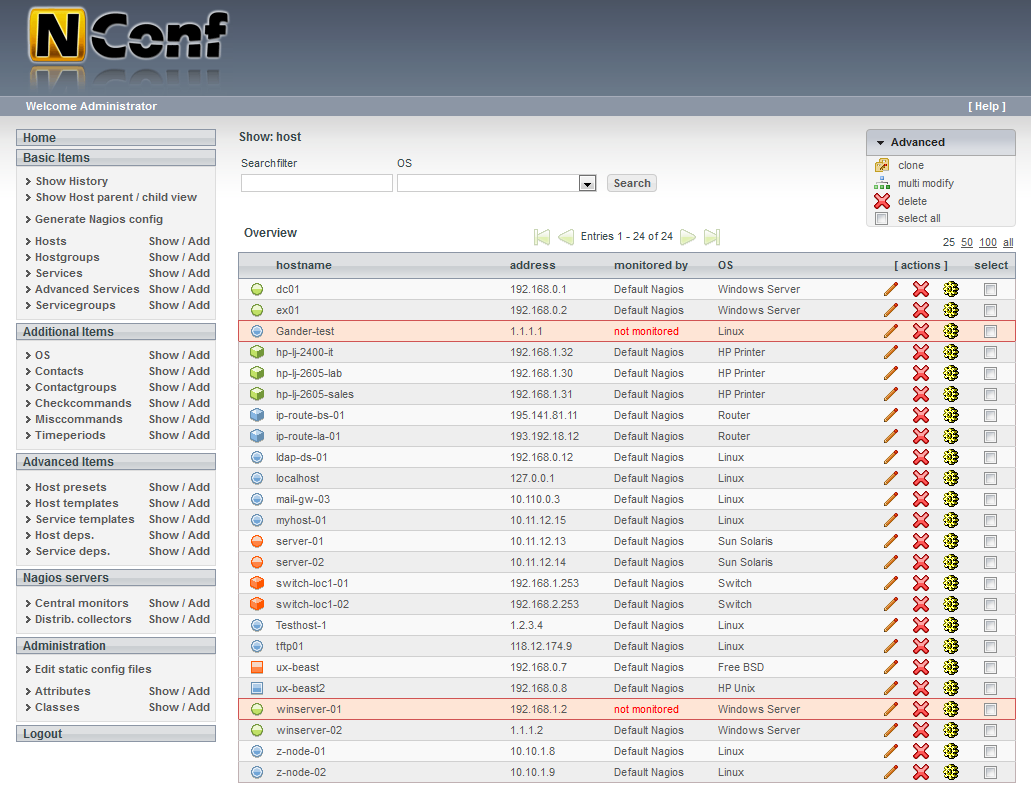
- Screenshot of the NConf "host overview"
- Developer(s): Fabian Gander, Angelo Gargiulo, Bernhard Waldvogel
- Initial release: March 5, 2009
- Stable release: 1.3.0 / December 11, 2011
- Repository: github.com/nconf/nconf
- Operating system: Unix-like
- Platform: Cross-platform
- Available in: english
- Type: Configuration management System administration Network management
- License: GNU General Public License
- Website: www.nconf.org

NConf is an open source tool for configuring the Nagios network monitoring system (and its fork Icinga). It is mainly targeted at sysadmins who are looking for a more convenient way of managing their Nagios configuration files through the use of a graphical user interface, as opposed to maintaining the configuration files with a text editor.

NConf allows central management of a distributed monitoring environment. It also offers various enterprise-like features such as LDAP authentication, a database API and configuration deployment over secure protocols (SCP, HTTPs). An import mechanism for importing existing configuration files is also available.

NConf is written mainly in PHP and Perl. All data is stored in a MySQL database. Dependencies for NConf are: Nagios, Apache web server, PHP, Perl, and MySQL.

== History ==
Development on NConf began in 2006. It was originally developed and used in-house exclusively by Sunrise Communications AG, a Swiss telecommunications provider. In 2009 Sunrise decided to make the software available to the public under the GNU General Public License (GPL). As of 2011, NConf source code is hosted in a public repository on GitHub.

== See also ==
- Nagios
- Icinga
