= MC4J =

- Stable release: 1.2.2 / May 9, 2008
- Written in: Java
- Operating system: Cross-platform (JVM)
- Type: JMX
- License: Apache License 2.0
- Website: https://sourceforge.net/projects/mc4j/

MC4J is an open source project to create a visual management application for Java servers supporting the JMX specification. It supports connections to all major J2EE application servers and JSE 5.0 and greater. The MC4J features shown as follows:

- Can connect to ten different server types from a single interface
- Multiple live connections to any combination of the supported servers
- Full MBean tree to view all the exposed information in a server
- View server configurations and statistics remotely
- Perform operations on a server
- Register and track notifications
- Monitor performance information from the JVM itself using JDK 5
- Dynamic charting for all numeric information
- Custom dashboards for specific features in a server
- Query the server to find specific MBeans by name or by their attributes

== See also ==
- MX4J
