= Historian (disambiguation) =

A historian is an individual who studies and writes on history.

Historian may also refer to:

- A list of historians includes hundreds of writers with articles in Wikipedia
- Operational historian, a software application that logs or historizes data
- Historian (medical), a medical term for the narrator of a medical history
- The Historian, a 2005 novel by Elizabeth Kostova
- The Historian (journal), a history journal
- Historian (album), a 2018 album by Lucy Dacus
- The Historian (film), a 2014 drama film
- The third highest ranking student in a graduating class
