= Stalag VI-K =

German World War II prisoner-of-war camp

Stalag VI-K (326)
- Senne, North Rhine-Westphalia
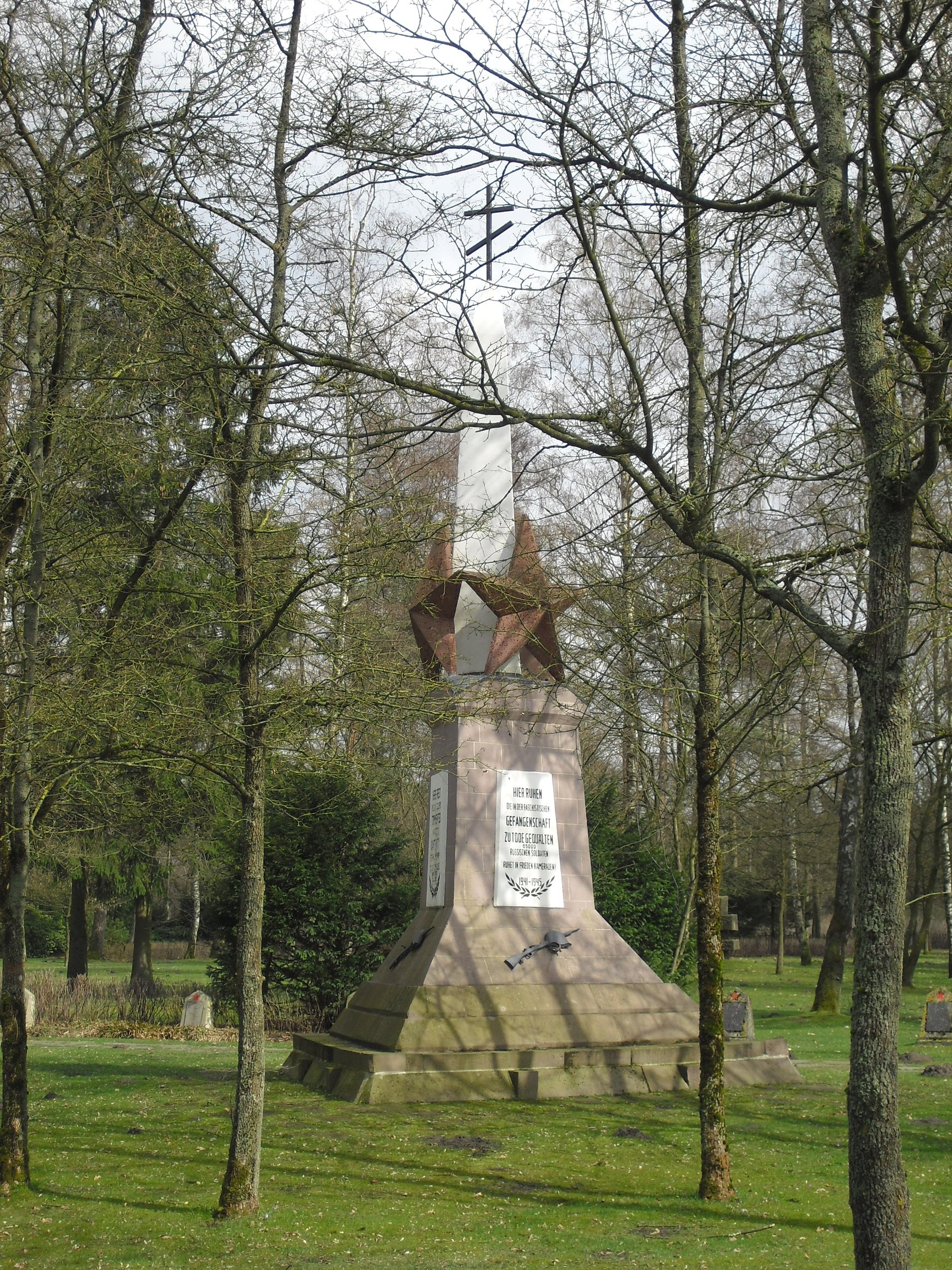
- Monument to Soviet prisoners of war buried at the camp

Site information
- Type: Prisoner-of-war camp
- Controlled by: Nazi Germany

Location
- Senne, Germany (pre-war borders, 1937)
- Location within Germany
- Coordinates: 51.86491°N 8.67709°E

Site history
- In use: 1941–1945

Garrison information
- Occupants: Primarily Soviet POWs

Stalag VI-K Senne (also known as Stalag 326) was a Nazi German World War II prisoner-of-war (POW) camp. It was named after the natural region of Senne where the camp was located, near the town of Schloß Holte-Stukenbrock, which is now in North Rhine-Westphalia, Germany.

During the war the camp held mostly Soviet POWs, but also some French, Polish and Italian prisoners.

On 2 April 1945, the camp was overrun by the rapidly advancing 2nd Armored Division, with troops of the U.S. 117th Infantry Regiment, 30th Division subsequently taking control.

From October 1946 to December 1947, the camp was operated by the British occupation authorities as Civil Internment Camp No. 7, holding Nazi Party and government officials. Early the following year the camp became Sozialwerk Stukenbrock, through which 150,000 refugees and displaced persons passed before it was closed in 1969. Since 1970, the camp administration blocks have housed a police training institute, and in the "Documentation Centre" there is a permanent exhibition of articles, photographs and documents pertaining to the camp.

Close to the camp there are 36 rows of mass graves containing the remains of Soviet POWs, and in addition around 400 graves of other men who died in the camp. In the mid-1960s a monument was erected to commemorate the approximately 65,000 Soviets interred in the mass graves.

== See also ==
- List of prisoner-of-war camps in Germany
