= JConsole =

JConsole is a graphical monitoring tool to monitor Java Virtual Machine (JVM) and Java applications both on a local or remote machine.

JConsole uses underlying features of Java Virtual Machine to provide information on performance and resource consumption of applications running on the Java platform using Java Management Extensions (JMX) technology. JConsole comes as part of Java Development Kit (JDK) and the graphical console can be started using "jconsole" command.

== See also ==
- Java Management Extensions
- Java Development Kit
