= Senner =

German breed of horse

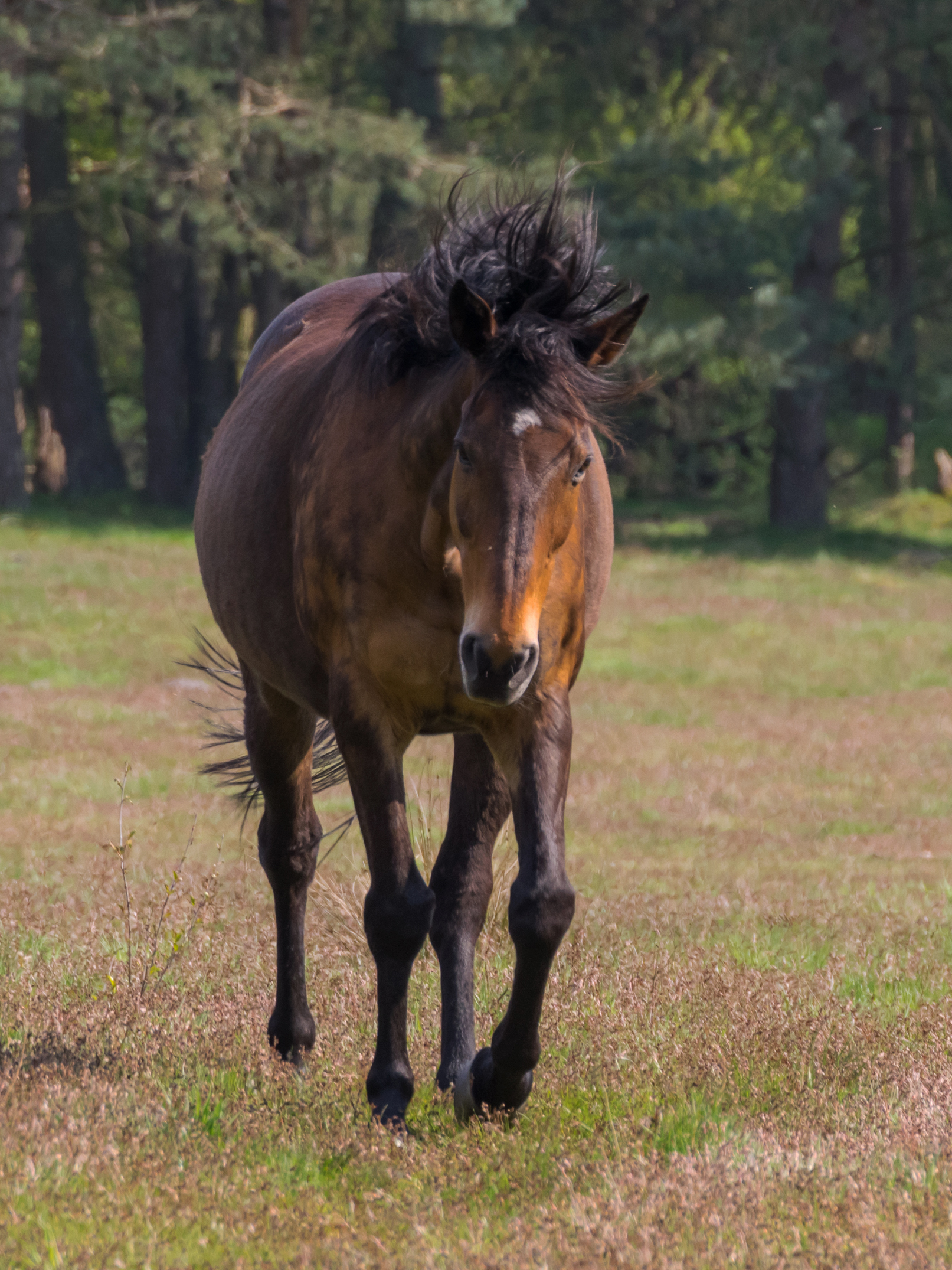
- In the Moosheide nature reserve, 2016
- Conservation status: FAO (2007): critically endangered; GEH (2017): extremely endangered
- Other names: German: Senner Pferd; Senne
- Country of origin: Germany
- Standard: [https://web.archive.org/web/20250809183455/https://www.senner.de/Zuchtprogramm%20Senner,%20incl.Anlage%20%20Stand%2010.11.2018.pdf
- Use: riding; conservation grazing

Traits
- Weight: Female: average 510 kg
- Height: range: 157–167 cm; Male: average 165 cm; Female: average 158 cm
- Colour: any

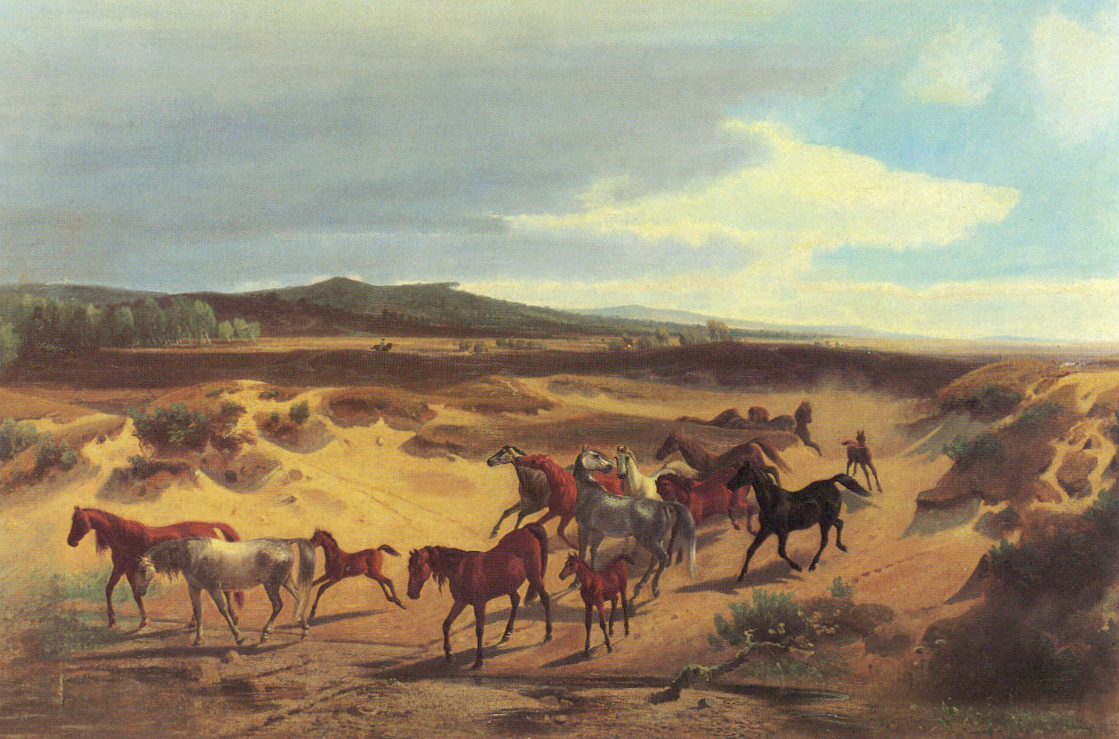
In the Senne in about 1860

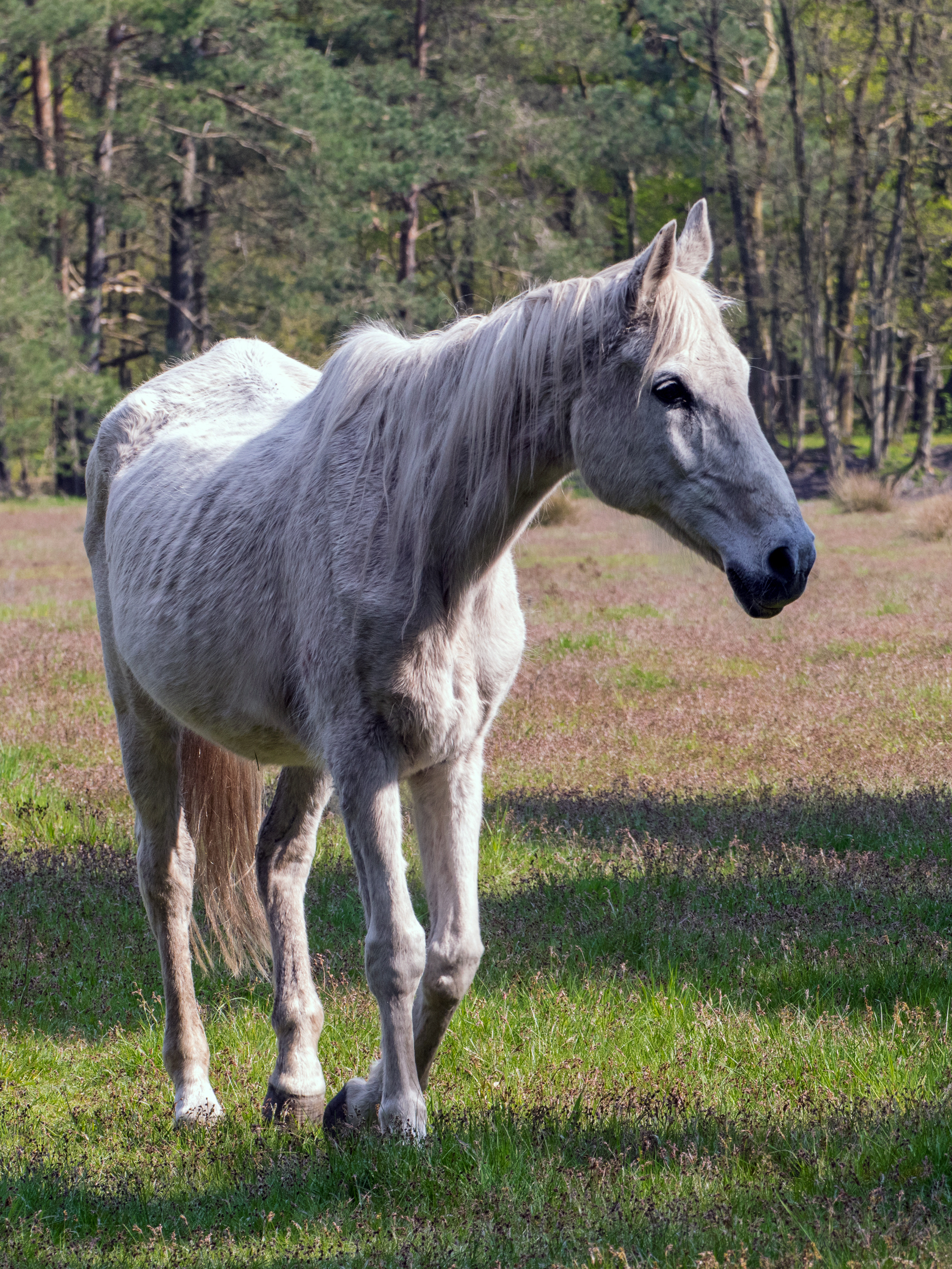
In the Moosheide nature reserve, 2016

The Senner or Senne is an endangered German breed of riding horse. It is believed to be the oldest saddle-horse breed in Germany, and is documented at least as far back as 1160. It is named for the Senne, a natural region of dunes and moorland in Nordrhein-Westfalen, in western Germany, and lived in feral herds there and in the Teutoburger Forest to the east.

It is a warmblood, and has been influenced at various times by Arab, Anglo-Arab, Thoroughbred and Iberian stock. It may have contributed to development of the Hanoverian.

== History ==
The origins of the Senner are not known; many records of the history of the breed were destroyed by fire in 1945. Herds of feral horses in the Senne moorlands are documented in several Mediaeval sources, one of which dates from 1160. The Senne lay within the Principality of Lippe, and the horses were raised to provide mounts for the ruling Lippe family. The centre of breeding was at Detmold until 1680, when it was moved to the stables of the Jagdschloss Lopshorn near Augustdorf. The horses were kept all year round on the heathland of the Senne and in the neighbouring Teutoburger Forest. Numbers were never very high; the number of breeding mares averaged about forty. Breeding records were kept from the early years of the eighteenth century, and a stud-book was started in 1713. There were four dam lines in the breed; only one of these, dating to 1725, survives.

From the late seventeenth century, Arab blood was introduced. Towards the end of the eighteenth century there was some cross-breeding with English Anglo-Arab and Thoroughbred stock, and in the early twentieth century, after the end of the First World War, there was some addition of Andalusian blood.

The Lopshorn castle was destroyed by fire in 1945. In 1946 the remaining Senner stock was dispersed to various owners. In 1999, some were introduced to the Moosheide nature reserve to assist in conservation grazing. A breed society, the Zuchtverband für Senner Pferde, was authorised in 2013 by the State of Nordrhein-Westfalen to keep the stud-book for the breed.

In 2007 the Food and Agriculture Organization of the United Nations listed the conservation status of the Senner as "critical". In the Rote Liste of the Gesellschaft zur Erhaltung alter und gefährdeter Haustierrassen, it is listed in Category I, "extremely endangered". In 2015 the total breeding population was reported at twenty-five head – nineteen mares and six stallions.

== Characteristics ==
The principal coat colours are bay and grey; black and chestnut also occur. Some horses show primitive markings including a dorsal stripe and zebra-striping on the legs.

== Use ==
The Senner was bred principally as a riding horse, even in times when working horses were in demand; it was also used as a carriage horse. Senner stallions stood at the royal stud of Weil bei Esslingen in Baden-Württemberg and at the state stud of Lipizza in the Austrian Empire.

In the twenty-first century the horses may be used for competition or recreational riding.
