= Lawrence C. Rafsky =

American data scientist and entrepreneur

Larry Rafsky
- Born: Lawrence C. Rafsky; Philadelphia, Pennsylvania, United States
- Education: Princeton University (A.B.), Yale University (P.h.D.)
- Occupations: Data Scientist, Entrepreneur
- Known for: Friedman-Rafsky Test, FAME
- Relatives: Robert Rafsky (brother)
- Awards: Theory and Methods Award, American Statistical Association Lifetime Achievement Award Nominee, Software and Information Industry Association

Lawrence C. Rafsky (Larry Rafsky), is an American data scientist, inventor, and entrepreneur. Rafsky created search algorithms and methodologies for the financial and news information industries. He is co-inventor of the Friedman-Rafsky Test commonly used to test goodness-of-fit for the multivariate normal distribution. Rafsky founded and became chief scientist for Acquire Media, a news and information syndication company, now a subsidiary of Moody's.

== Research ==
Rafsky invented the Friedman-Rafsky Test, along with Jerome H. Friedman, now a fundamental procedure in multivariate data. This Multivariate normality test checks a given set of data for goodness-of-fit to the multivariate normal distribution. The null hypothesis is that the data set is a sample from the normal distribution, therefore a sufficiently small p-value indicates non-normal data. In 1981, Rafsky outlined this algorithm in a study published by the Journal of the American Statistical Association. Rafsky and Friedman qualified their test in a 1983 publication in collaboration with Stanford University and Gemnet Software. The two asserted that interpoint-distance-based graphs are capable of being used to define measures of association that extend Kendall's notion of a correlized co-efficient. For this research, Rafsky was granted the Theory and Methods Award from the American Statistical Association in 1981. Rafsky also holds ten US patents, focused on the syndication, delivery, and aggregation of news content. He has a scholar h-index of 15, a g-index of 37, and an Erdos number of 3.

== Business ==
=== Gemnet Software and FAME ===
In 1982, Rafsky founded Gemnet, the creator of the FAME (Forecasting Analysis and Modeling Environment) time series database. Rafsky established Gemnet's operations initially in Ann Arbor, Michigan, but was later moved following Citicorp's acquisition of the company. The first version of the software was delivered to Harris Bank in 1983, with a focus on creating a time series-oriented database engine and the 4GL scripting language. This would eventually become known as the FAME model, or Forecasting Analysis and Modeling Environment. In 1984, the company was bought by Citicorp, which led a series of new developments with the FAME program until selling off the unit to private equity firm Warburg Pincus in 1994.

=== Later ventures ===
In the 1990s, Rafsky research and management positions at Bell Labs, Citicorp, the IDD Information Services, and ADP. Rafsky worked with future Baidu founder and chief executive officer Robin Li, who helped pioneer early search engine algorithms. IDD, a division of Dow Jones focused on financial news and information's relation to securities pricings. Rafsky partnered with ADP and Townsend-Greenspan, the consulting firm of US economist Alan Greenspan. In 1998, Rafsky founded Gari Software, which he later sold to Wavephore Labs. He subsequently formed Acquire Media, a digital content syndication company in 2001. He retired from full-time work at Acquire Media in 2018, and currently serves the firm part-time doing research in Machine Learning, Natural Language Processing, and statistical modeling of the business news ecosystem. He also serves as Director of Research for my4, an organization dedicated to investment analytics focused on ESG - Environmental, social and corporate governance.

== Personal life ==
Rafsky was born in Philadelphia. He is the brother of Robert Rafsky, author and AIDS rights activist known for his televised confrontation with Bill Clinton during the 1992 presidential election. Having spent most of his life living in New Jersey, he now resides in Jupiter, Florida.

=== Awards ===
Rafsky received the Theory and Methods award from the American Statistical Association following his work in the development of the Friedman-Rafsky Test. He was also a finalist for the Lifetime Achievement Award from the Software and Information Industry Association (SIIA).
