= Grafana =

Open-source analytics and visualization platform

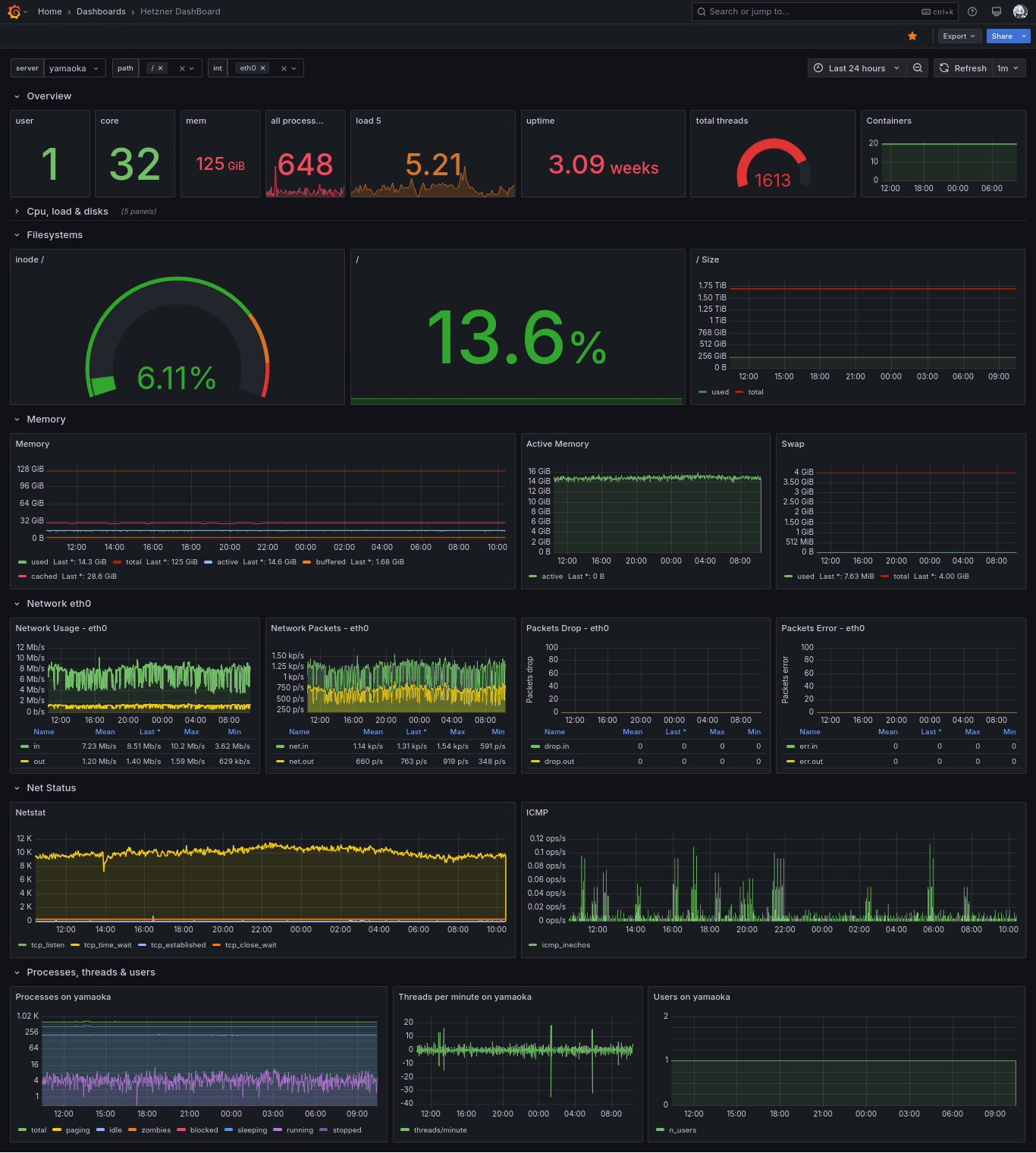
- Grafana dashboard for a MusicBrainz server
- Developer: Grafana Labs
- Release: January 2014; 12 years ago
- Stable release: 13.3.0 / 27 October 2026; 11 days ago
- Written in: Go (backend), TypeScript (frontend)
- Operating system: Linux, macOS, Windows
- Type: Data visualization, business intelligence
- License: AGPLv3
- Website: grafana.com
- Repository: github.com/grafana/grafana

Grafana is an open-source analytics and visualization web application. It connects to time series databases and other data sources, allowing users to build dashboards that display metrics, logs, and traces. Grafana supports data sources including Prometheus, AWS CloudWatch, Graphite, InfluxDB, Elasticsearch, PostgreSQL, and MySQL.

Torkel Ödegaard released Grafana in January 2014 as an outgrowth of work on Graphite at Orbitz. The user interface was originally based on version 3 of Kibana. The company behind the project, initially named Raintank, rebranded as Grafana Labs and has raised over $500 million in venture capital funding, reaching a $6 billion valuation in 2024.

Since 2021, Grafana has been licensed under the AGPLv3 (previously Apache 2.0). Grafana Labs provides two commercial Grafana offerings: Grafana Cloud for managed deployments and Grafana Enterprise for self-managed environments.

Grafana Cloud provides hosted Grafana, managed telemetry services, and additional capabilities such as Adaptive Telemetry for telemetry optimization and Grafana Assistant for AI-assisted observability workflows. Grafana Enterprise contains features including LDAP team synchronization, data source permissions, and reporting.

== History ==
Grafana was first released in January 2014, initially targeting Graphite and InfluxDB as data sources. It later added support for relational databases including MySQL, PostgreSQL, and Microsoft SQL Server.

Grafana Labs was founded in 2014 as Raintank and later adopted the name, Grafana, which combines Graphite and Kibana. The company raised $24 million in Series A funding in 2019, $50 million in Series B in 2020, $220 million in Series C in 2021 (at a $3 billion valuation), and $270 million in 2024 at a $6 billion valuation.

Grafana Labs has acquired several companies to expand its observability stack: Kausal (2018), k6 (2021, load testing), Pace (2021, developer tooling), Amixr (2021, incident response), Pyroscope (2023, continuous profiling), Asserts.ai (2023, AI-assisted observability), TailCtrl (2024, trace sampling), and LogLine (2026, log querying).

== Architecture ==
Grafana's backend is written in Go and its frontend in TypeScript using React. The application runs as a single binary that serves a web interface and connects to external data sources through a plugin system.

Grafana supports three types of plugins: data source plugins for querying backends, panel plugins for visualization types, and app plugins, which bundle data sources, panels, dashboards and custom pages into an integrated experience.

Grafana does not store the metrics, logs, or traces it visualizes; it queries external data sources when a dashboard is rendered and can combine results from several sources in a single panel. It maintains its own relational database (SQLite by default, or MySQL or PostgreSQL) for dashboards, users, annotations and alert state. Core data sources shipped with Grafana include Prometheus, Graphite, InfluxDB and OpenTSDB for metrics; Loki and Elasticsearch for logs; Tempo, Jaeger and Zipkin for traces; Pyroscope and Parca for profiles; and MySQL, PostgreSQL and Microsoft SQL Server. Other backends, including OpenSearch and Splunk, are available as separately installed plugins.

Dashboards are defined as JSON documents that can be provisioned from files and kept under version control. Dashboards can be exported to a catalog of official and community-built dashboards, and individual dashboards can be shared outside an organization using a feature called externally shared dashboards. Alert rules can query data sources that support alerting, including several data sources within a single rule, and route notifications to destinations such as email, Slack, PagerDuty, and other channels.

== LGTM Stack ==
Grafana Labs develops a set of open-source backends that are often deployed together as the "LGTM Stack" (Loki, Grafana, Tempo, Mimir):

- Loki: A horizontally scalable, highly available, multi-tenant log aggregation system inspired by Prometheus. Loki indexes metadata rather than the full text of the log lines. The Loki project started at Grafana Labs in 2018 and is released under the AGPLv3 license.
- Mimir: A horizontally scalable, highly available, multi-tenant time-series database for long-term storage of Prometheus metrics. The Mimir project was announced by Grafana Labs in 2022 as a replacement for Cortex and is released under the AGPLv3 license.
- Tempo: A high-scale distributed tracing database that requires only object storage to operate and does not index trace data. Tempo can ingest common open source tracing protocols, including Jaeger, Zipkin and OpenTelemetry. The Tempo project was announced by Grafana Labs in 2020 and is released under the AGPLv3 license.
- Pyroscope: A highly available, multi-tenant continuous profiling database for storing and querying profiling data at scale. Pyroscope integrates natively with Grafana to correlate profiles with metrics, logs and traces. The Pyroscope project was announced by Grafana Labs in 2023 and is released under the AGPLv3 license.

== Other open source projects ==
In addition to the LGTM Stack, Grafana Labs, has developed additional open-source projects:

- Alloy: A vendor-neutral distribution of the OpenTelemetry Collector, offering native pipelines for OpenTelemetry, Prometheus, Loki, Tempo, and Pyroscope telemetry formats to collect metrics, logs, traces, and profiles. Alloy replaced Grafana Agent, which entered long-term support in 2024 and reached end-of-life in November 2025. The Alloy project was announced by Grafana Labs at GrafanaCON in 2024 and is released under the Apache 2.0 license.
- Beyla: An eBPF-based automatic instrumentation tool that captures RED (rate, error, duration) metrics and trace spans for Linux HTTP/S and gRPC services without modifying application code. Beyla supports applications written in Go, C/C++, Rust, Python, Ruby, Java, Node.js, and .NET. The Beyla project was started at Grafana Labs and announced in 2023. It was donated to the OpenTelemetry project in 2025 as OpenTelemetry eBPF Instrumentation, and is released under the Apache 2.0 license.
- Faro: A web SDK for real user monitoring (RUM) that instruments browser-based frontend applications to capture performance metrics, logs, exceptions, user events, and traces. Faro data can be correlated with backend and infrastructure telemetry in the LGTM stack for full-stack observability. The Faro project was announced by Grafana Labs in 2022 and is released under the Apache 2.0 license.
- k6: Load and performance testing tool that uses test scripts written in JavaScript or TypeScript to help identify and fix performance issues before they reach production. The k6 project was started in 2016 as LoadImpact and was acquired by Grafana Labs in 2021, and is released under the AGPLv3 license.

== Adoption ==
Grafana is used by Wikimedia's infrastructure, NASA and the Tour de France (for real-time race telemetry). As of 2026, Grafana Labs has more than 10,000 paying customers, including Nvidia, Anthropic and Uber.

== See also ==
- Comparison of network monitoring systems
- Graphite (software)
- Prometheus (software)
- Kibana
