= FAME (database) =

Database

FAME (Forecasting Analysis and Modeling Environment) is a time series database released in 1981 and owned by FIS Global.

== History ==
The FAME software environment had several development phases during its history. Lawrence C. Rafsky founded GemNet Software Corp to create FAME in 1981. It was an independent software company located in Ann Arbor, Michigan. The first version of the software was delivered to Harris Bank in 1983. The company was purchased by CitiCorp in 1984. SunGard acquired FAME in 2004. In 2010, Sungard merged FAME and MarketMap Data into the MarketMap brand. FIS Global acquired Sungard in 2015.

== Toolkits and connectors ==
R Interface: FAME customers have developed and released an interface as free software that links FAME objects to the open-source R statistical package. Originally developed at the Federal Reserve Board, features include a time series adaptation of FAME to R, frequency conformance, and a set of fundamental statistical functions.

== See also ==
- Time series database
