= SNMPTT =

SNMP trap handler

- Original author: Alex Burger
- Release: April 18th, 2002
- Stable release: 1.5 / 18 August 2022; 3 years ago
- Operating system: Most
- Type: Network Monitoring
- License: GNU General Public License
- Website: www.snmptt.org
- Repository: github.com/snmptt/snmptt

SNMPTT is an SNMP trap handler written in Perl for use with the NET-SNMP/UCD-SNMP snmptrapd program. Received traps are translated into user friendly messages using variable substitution. Output can be to STDOUT, text log file, syslog, NT Event Log, MySQL (Linux/Windows), PostgreSQL, or an ODBC database. User defined programs can also be executed.

== Distribution ==
SNMPTT can be downloaded from the SourceForge project page or the project web page.

== Books ==
Information on SNMPTT is available in the following books:

- Turnbull, James; (2006) Pro Nagios 2.0 - San Francisco: Apress ISBN 1-59059-609-9
- Schubert, Max et al.; (2008) Nagios 3 Enterprise Network Monitoring - Syngress ISBN 978-1-59749-267-6
- Barth, Wolfgang; (2008) Nagios: System And Network Monitoring, 2nd edition - No Starch Press ISBN 1-59327-179-4
