= Senne (Germany) =

Region in Northrhine-Westphalia, Germany

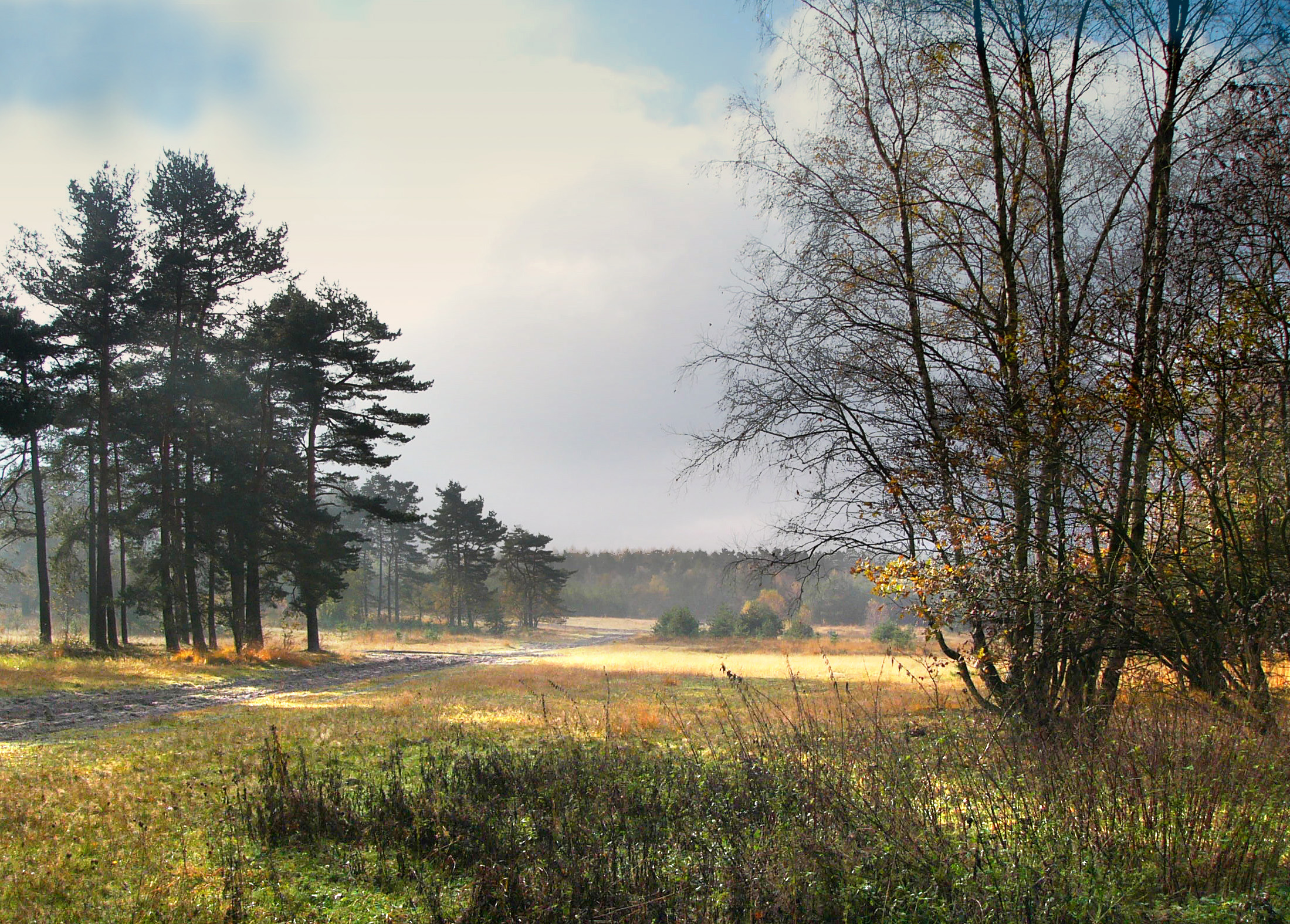

- Location within North Rhine-Westphalia
- Interactive map of Senne

Geography
- Location: Ostwestfalen-Lippe, Nordrhein-Westfalen, Germany
- Coordinates: 51.85°N 8.78°E
- Area: 210 km^{2} (81 sq mi)

Ecology
- Ecosystems: moorland, sand dunes

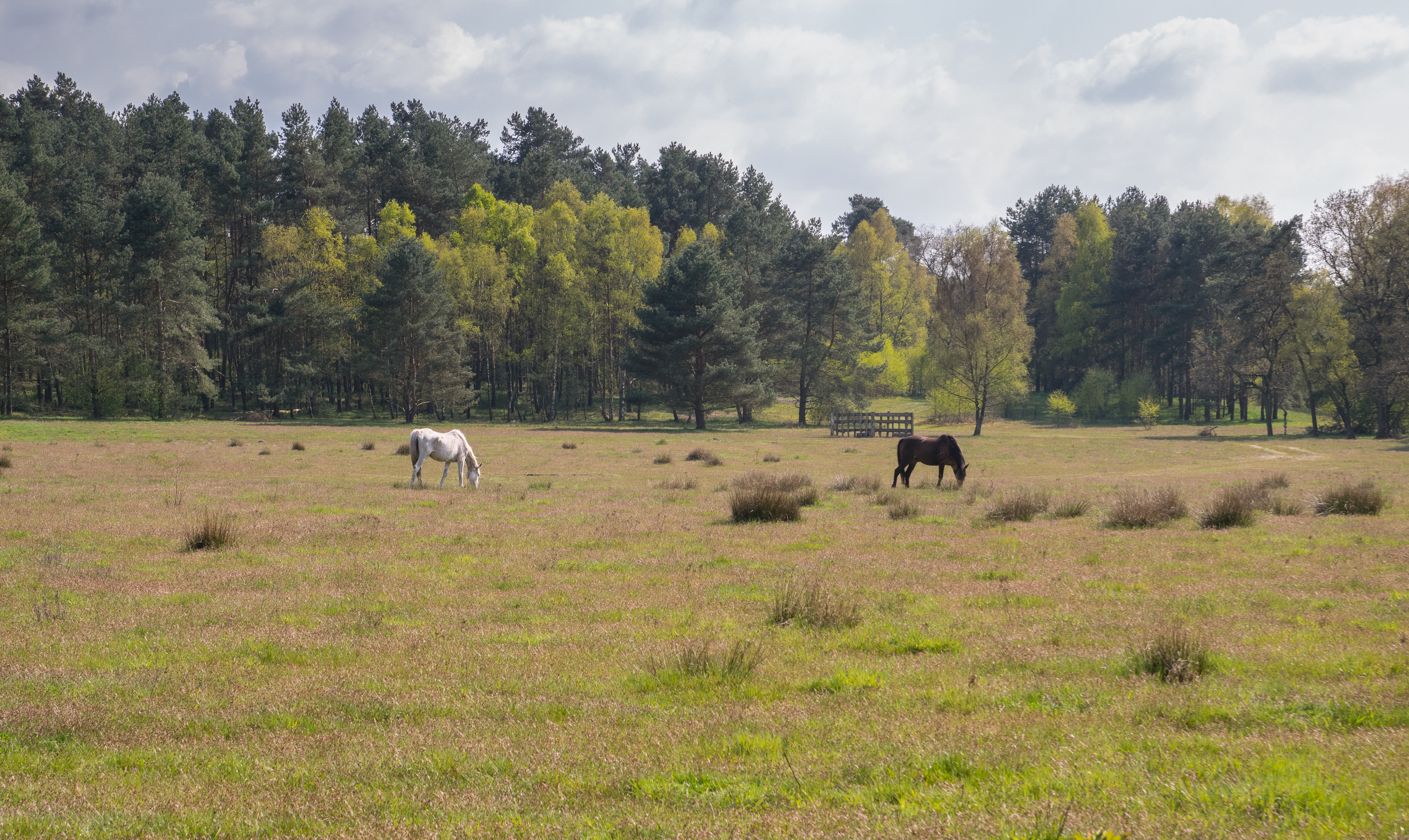
Senner horses in the Moosheide nature reserve

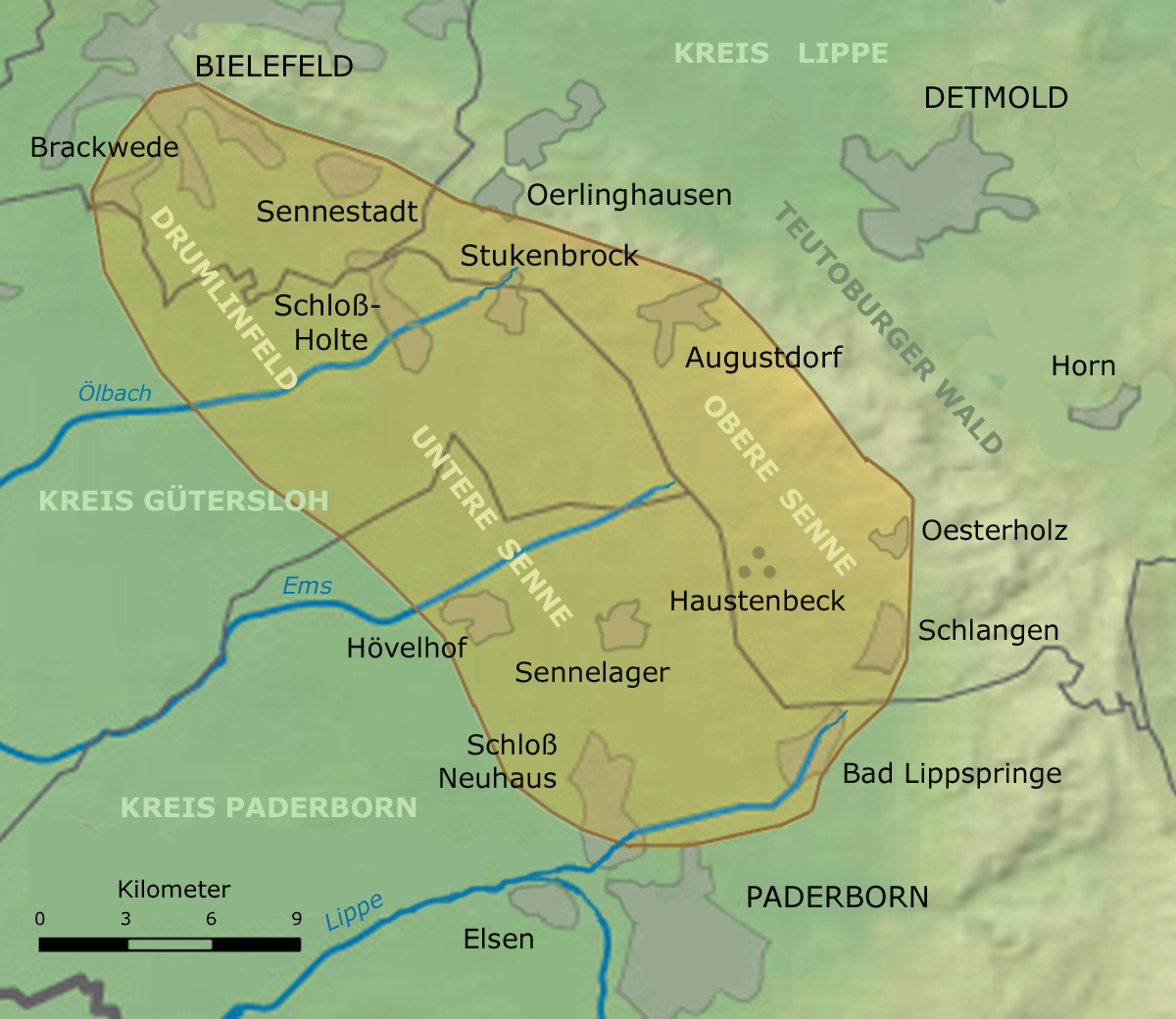
Map of the Senne

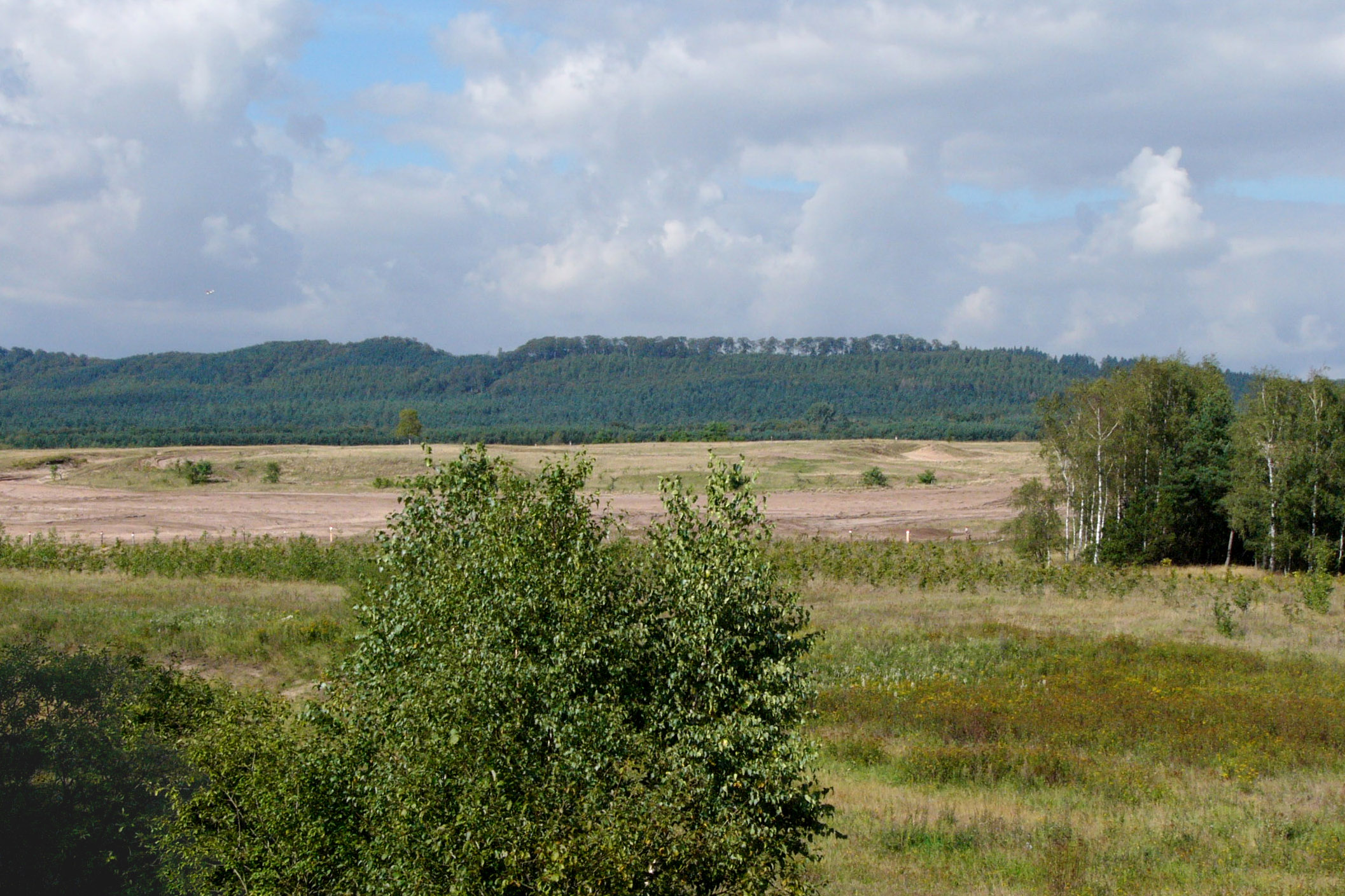
Near Oerlinghausen, view towards the Teutoburger Forest

The Senne (German pronunciation: [ˈzɛnə]) is a natural region in the Regierungsbezirk of Detmold, in the state of Nordrhein-Westfalen in west-central Germany. It lies to the west of the Teutoburger Forest, and has an area of approximately 210 km^{2}. It lies between the cities of Bielefeld to the north-west, Detmold to the north-east, and Paderborn to the south.

Heath, calcareous grassland, and moorland cover most of the area. The river Ems arises here. Flora and fauna are very rich in the Senne, 901 of the 5000 animal and plant species are listed on the IUCN Red List.

116 km^{2} of the Senne and therefore more than the half of it area are taken by the Sennelager Training Area, which is mainly used by British forces. By 2020 all of the planned reductions in British forces had been completed, which now leaves the future of this landscape undecided.

== Fauna ==
The region is the home of a critically-endangered breed of riding horse, the Senner, which is believed to be the oldest breed of riding horse in Germany, and is documented at least as far back as 1160. It lived in feral herds in the moorlands and in the Teutoburger Forest to the east. In 1999, some were introduced to the Moosheide nature reserve to assist in conservation grazing.
