= K 6 (keelboat) =

Development
- Designer: Einar Ohlson
- Year: 1944

Boat
- Draft: 1.03 m (3.4 ft)

Hull
- LOA: 6.10 m (20.0 ft)
- LWL: 5.64 m (18.5 ft)
- Beam: 2.25 m (7.4 ft)

K 6 is a 6.10-metre (20.0 ft) sailboat class designed by Einar Ohlson and built in about 50 copies.

== History ==
The K 6 designed by Einar Ohlson was the winner of a design competition held by Svenska Kosterbåtsförbundet.
