= K6 (software) =

Open-source load testing software

k6
- Developer: Grafana Labs
- Release: January 18, 2017; 9 years ago
- Stable release: 2.1.0 / June 30, 2026; 22 days ago
- Written in: JavaScript, Go
- Operating system: Cross-platform
- Type: Load testing
- License: AGPL 3
- Website: k6.io
- Repository: github.com/grafana/k6

K6 is an open-source load testing tool developed by Grafana Labs. It is designed to help developers and engineers test the performance and reliability of their systems, particularly APIs, microservices, and websites. K6 is both an HTTP load and functional test tool, written in Go and using the goja embedded JavaScript interpreter for test scripting purposes. Tests are written in ECMAScript 6 using the Babel transpiler. There is support for HTTP/2, TLS, test assertions, ramp up and down, duration, number of iterations etc. Standard metrics include reports to standard out but can include collectors that report to time-series databases which can be visualized in real-time. There is a Jenkins plugin that can be combined with thresholds (global pass/fail criteria).

== History ==
K6 was initially released by LoadImpact in 2017. LoadImpact was later rebranded into k6 in 2020. K6 was then acquired by Grafana Labs in 2021. It has since become a popular tool for performance testing in the developer community.

Grafana k6 1.0 was released on 2025-05-07 at GrafanaCON 2025, introducing first-class TypeScript support, semantic versioning, and a stable k6/browser module.

Grafana k6 2.0 was released on 2026-05-11, the final release of the v2 major version, completing the removal of deprecated APIs, commands, and configuration options.

== Example and usage ==
The below script executes a GET request on the Wikipedia homepage, checks whether the HTTP status code is 200 and if we are using the HTTP/2 protocol.

import http from "k6/http";
import { check } from "k6";

export default function() {
  check(http.get("https://www.wikipedia.org/"), {
    "status is 200": (r) => r.status == 200,
    "protocol is HTTP/2": (r) => r.proto == "HTTP/2.0",
  });
}

The above test case can be run with the command $ k6 run http_2.js where http_2.js is the filename in which the test case is saved in.

== See also ==
- Software load testing
- Grafana
- Continuous integration
- Playwright (software)
