= Robert Rafsky =

American writer, publicist, and AIDS activist (1945–1993)

- Born: Robert Alan Rafsky; July 22, 1945; Philadelphia, Pennsylvania, U.S.
- Died: February 21, 1993 (aged 47); New York University Medical Center
- Cause of death: AIDS-related complications
- Education: Harvard College (B.A.)
- Occupations: Writer; publicist; HIV/AIDS activist
- Organization(s): ACT UP; Treatment Action Group
- Known for: HIV/AIDS activism
- Children: 1
- Relatives: Lawrence C. Rafsky (brother)

Robert Alan Rafsky (July 22, 1945 – February 21, 1993) was an American writer, publicist, and HIV/AIDS activist.

== Early life and education ==
Robert Alan Rafsky was born on July 22, 1945, in Philadelphia to civil servant William L. Rafsky of Łódź, Poland and Selma Rafsky née Chafets in Philadelphia. His family was politically active. Lawrence C. Rafsky was his brother. He enrolled at Harvard College in the fall of 1963. Rafsky lived in Wigglesworth and volunteered at the Loeb Drama Center. He was expelled for academic reasons but was later readmitted in 1964 and later became the managing editor of The Harvard Crimson. Rafsky graduated Harvard in 1968.

== Career ==
Rafsky worked as a teacher after graduation, but ultimately pursued more lucrative careers.

Rafsky worked in public relations in New York. He worked for the Empire State Development Corporation, Howard Rubenstein & Associates, and Pro-Media.

Rafsky became involved with ACT UP in 1987 after his diagnosis with AIDS. He later became the chief spokesperson of ACT UP, assisting the organization in gaining prominent national coverage. Correspondent and organizer Victor Zonana remarked that Rafsky "was articulate, contentious, persuasive, dogged and very often right." David B. Feinberg called Rafsky the "heart and soul of ACT UP." Rafsky was a nationally recognized HIV/AIDS activist. His 1992 confrontation with then-presidential candidate Bill Clinton secured much publicity and made HIV/AIDS a presidential campaign issue. Rafsky said, "I can't calm down. I'm dying of AIDS while you're dying of ambition," to which Clinton eventually responded, "I feel your pain." Rafsky also helped draft an AIDS agenda for the Clinton Administration. Additionally, in 1992 Rafsky delivered a speech titled "Bury Me Furiously" at the funeral of fellow ACT UP member Mark Fisher. Within the speech, Rafsky demanded change and publicly denounced the George H. W. Bush administration for their negligence of the AIDS epidemic. The impact of both the confrontation with Bill Clinton and "Bury Me Furiously" led to not only increased national awareness for the epidemic, but priority for policy within the Clinton administration.

Rafsky was an active member of the Treatment Action Group. Peter Staley said that Rafsky was "enormously influential" in one-to-one interactions. Rafsky wrote personal essays about AIDS for The New York Times, The Village Voice, the New York Daily News, OutWeek, and QW. He was writing a book comprising letters to his daughter at the time of his death.

== Personal life ==
Rafsky was married to Babette Krolik and had a daughter named Sara. He came out in 1985 and later divorced his wife, sharing joint custody of their daughter. It was at this time that Rafsky began telling his friends he was gay. Around 1987, he contracted AIDS. He died of AIDS-related complications on February 21, 1993, at the New York University Medical Center.

== Legacy ==
Rafsky's role with ACT UP was a focal part of David France's 2012 documentary How to Survive a Plague and France's 2016 book of the same name.

== See also ==
- LGBT culture in New York City
- List of AIDS activists
