= TimescaleDB =

Open-source time series database

- Developer: Timescale Inc (renamed Tiger Data)
- Release: 1 November 2018; 7 years ago
- Stable release: 2.30.1 / 17 September 2026; 6 days ago
- Written in: C
- Operating system: Cross-platform
- Type: Time series database
- License: Apache 2.0
- Website: tigerdata.com
- Repository: https://github.com/timescale/timescaledb

TimescaleDB is an open-source time series database developed by Timescale Inc. (renamed "TigerData" on June 17, 2025). It is written in C and extends PostgreSQL. TimescaleDB is a relational database and supports standard SQL queries. Additional SQL functions and table structures provide support for time series data oriented towards storage, performance, and analysis facilities for data-at-scale.

One of the key features of TimescaleDB is its performance, which has been compared to InfluxDB. Time-based data partitioning via hypertables provides for improved query execution and performance when used for time oriented applications. More granular partition definition is achieved through the use of user defined attributes.

TimescaleDB is offered as open source software under the Apache 2.0 license. Additional features are offered in a community edition as source available software under the Timescale License Agreement (TLS).

== History ==
Timescale was founded by Ajay Kulkarni (CEO) and Michael J. Freedman (CTO) in response to their need for a database solution to support internet of things workloads.
