= Nagios =

Open-source network and infrastructure monitoring software

Nagios Core
- Original author: Ethan Galstad
- Developer: Nagios Enterprises
- Initial release: March 14, 1999; 26 years ago
- Stable release: 4.5.11 / January 15, 2026; 54 days ago
- Written in: C
- Operating system: Linux, Unix
- Type: Network monitoring
- License: GPLv2
- Website: www.nagios.org
- Repository: github.com/NagiosEnterprises/nagioscore

Nagios (/ˈnɑːɡiːoʊs/) is an open-source network and infrastructure monitoring system. It monitors hosts, services, and network devices, sending alerts when components fail and again when they recover. Originally written by Ethan Galstad in 1999 as NetSaint, it was renamed Nagios in 2002 after a trademark dispute. The name is a recursive acronym: "Nagios Ain't Gonna Insist On Sainthood."

Nagios uses a plugin-based architecture: the core scheduler runs check plugins at configured intervals, processes the results, and triggers notifications. Hundreds of community-developed plugins exist for monitoring specific services and hardware. Nagios is written in C and runs on Linux and other Unix systems. It is licensed under the GPLv2.

Galstad founded Nagios Enterprises in 2007 to provide commercial support and the proprietary Nagios XI product. The project's plugin-architecture model influenced several derivative projects, including Icinga (2009), Shinken (2009), Naemon (2013), and Checkmk.

== History ==
Galstad released NetSaint 0.0.1 on March 14, 1999. The initial release supported host and service monitoring via plugins, with notifications by email and pager. NetSaint was registered on SourceForge about two months before the project that became OpenNMS.

In 2002, Galstad renamed the project to Nagios after the owners of a similarly named trademark raised a legal challenge. Although an agreement was reached, Galstad chose to change the name to avoid future disputes. "Agios" (hagios) transliterates the Greek word for "saint," linking the new name to the old.

Nagios 2.0 (February 2006) added a redesigned web interface and the Event Broker (NEB) module API, which allowed third-party software to access Nagios's internal data structures. Nagios 3.0 (March 2008) introduced adaptive monitoring and improved performance for large installations. Nagios 4.0 (September 2013) added a redesigned CGI interface, worker processes for parallel check execution, and reduced CPU usage on large deployments.

=== Icinga fork ===
In May 2009, a group of community developers forked Nagios as Icinga, citing frustration with slow development, lack of community involvement in decision-making, and what they considered insufficient response to submitted patches. Icinga initially maintained compatibility with Nagios plugins and configuration files. Icinga 2 (2014) was a ground-up rewrite with a new configuration language and distributed monitoring support.

=== Plugins controversy ===
On January 16, 2014, Nagios Enterprises redirected the nagios-plugins.org domain to a server it controlled without notifying the community plugin team. The displaced maintainers continued their work under the name "Monitoring Plugins" at monitoring-plugins.org.

== Architecture ==
=== Plugin model ===
Nagios Core does not perform monitoring checks directly. Instead, it executes external programs (plugins) that test a specific service or resource and return a status code: 0 (OK), 1 (WARNING), 2 (CRITICAL), or 3 (UNKNOWN). This design allows administrators to write custom plugins in any language. The project maintains an official plugin set, and hundreds of community plugins are available from the Monitoring Plugins project and Nagios Exchange.

=== Agents ===
NRPE
The Nagios Remote Plugin Executor runs plugins on remote Linux/Unix systems and returns results to the Nagios server via the check_nrpe plugin. NRPE 4.0.1 was deprecated in January 2020.
NRDP
The Nagios Remote Data Processor uses HTTP and XML for flexible passive check submission, replacing the older NSCA protocol.
NCPA
The Nagios Cross Platform Agent runs on Windows, Linux, and macOS, providing both active and passive check capabilities through a REST API.
NSClient++
A Windows-focused agent that reports system metrics (CPU, memory, disk, processes) to Nagios via the check_nt plugin.

=== Web interface ===
Nagios Core provides a CGI-based web interface for viewing host and service status, alert history, and availability reports. The interface displays a tactical overview, status maps, and alert histograms.

== Nagios XI ==
Nagios XI is a proprietary monitoring platform built on Nagios Core. It provides a PHP-based web interface, a configuration wizard system, customizable dashboards, capacity planning reports, and integration with RRDtool and Highcharts for graphing. The backend uses MySQL for configuration and event data (via the NDOUtils module). Nagios XI runs on CentOS and RHEL.

== See also ==
- Comparison of network monitoring systems
- Icinga – Open-source network monitoring application forked from Nagios
- Naemon – Open-source network and infrastructure monitoring software
- Checkmk – IT infrastructure monitoring software
- Zabbix
- OpenNMS
- Prometheus
- MRTG
