= MX4J =

- Stable release: 3.0.2 / October 12, 2006
- Written in: Java
- Operating system: Cross-platform (JVM)
- Type: JMX Library
- License: Apache License 2.0
- Website: https://mx4j.sourceforge.net

JMX architecture.

MX4J is a project to create an open-source implementation of Java Management Extensions (JMX). The JMX specification is a Java Specification Request (see JSR 003) currently in maintenance release 1.2; the new JSR 160 has been issued to address connectivity to a remote JMX agent. MX4J implements both JSR 3 and JSR 160.

The MX4J project goals can be simplified as:

- Closely adhere to the JMX specification.
- Develop a highly robust codebase.
- Be 100% compatible with the reference implementations.

Due to its simplicity, MX4J is widely adopted in open source projects like Jetty Server, Tomcat, Geronimo, Harmony, ObjectWeb JOnAS and many others.

Activity on MX4J project has now ceased.
