= RANCID (software) =

Network management application

RANCID (Really Awesome New Cisco Config Differ) is a network management application released under a BSD-style license. RANCID uses Expect to connect to the routers, send some commands and put the results in files.

== Software which utilises RANCID-collected configs ==
- LibreNMS
- Observium
- OpenNMS

== See also ==
- Network management system (NMS)
- Console Server
- Router
- Switch
