= Time series database =

Unordered set of n-time-series possibly of different lengths

A time series database (TSDB) is a software system optimized for handling time series data—a sequence of data points indexed in chronological order. In various scientific and financial disciplines, these chronological sequences may be referred to as profiles, curves, traces, or trends. Early iterations of these databases were primarily associated with industrial applications, where they functioned as data historians to efficiently record measurements from physical sensors; however, modern implementations now span a much wider range of uses. Due to the high ingestion rates and sequential nature of this data, TSDB repositories heavily utilize specialized compression algorithms to manage storage efficiently. While time-series data can be stored across various database types, systems designed around a temporal primary index differ structurally from relational databases, which optimize for discrete relationships using referential models.

== Overview ==
Compared to general-purpose datasets, time series datasets are highly uniform and scale rapidly, typically consisting of sequential timestamps mapped to specific metric values. Because individual entries rarely feature complex, cross-table relational dependencies, TSDBs do not require the overhead of traditional relational constraints. Furthermore, because these workloads seldom demand indefinite data retention, TSDBs can drastically reduce storage footprints and accelerate queries relative to general-purpose databases.

For example, the sequential uniformity of temporal data allows specialized compression algorithms—such as delta encoding or Gorilla compression—to achieve significantly higher data density than standard compression techniques. Additionally, while general-purpose systems are optimized for persistent data retention, TSDBs natively automate data lifecycle management by downsampling or dropping entire historical data partitions in bulk. Finally, specialized temporal indexing strategies further isolate time windows to maximize query performance.

== Workloads and design paradigms ==
Time series databases are commonly designed for append-only workloads, where massive volumes of sequential observations or discrete events are continuously ingested alongside corresponding timestamps. Purpose-built series management systems are specifically designed to ingest and process data from infrastructure monitoring, system automation, the internet of things (IoT), and complex cyber-physical networks. In these environments, data streams are typically generated at extreme velocities and high volumes.

Primary design paradigms focus on maximizing write throughput, ensuring low-latency range queries, utilizing highly efficient data compression, and natively supporting multi-window temporal aggregations or automated downsampling. To facilitate multidimensional indexing, many implementations organize data using a schema composed of key-value tags, device IDs, or other metadata. This metadata structure allows applications to isolate and query telemetry based simultaneously on specific time intervals and source attributes.

== Applications and workloads ==
Time series databases are deployed across diverse industries where continuous chronological data collection is critical. Common application areas include industrial automation monitoring, operational data historians, infrastructure and application performance monitoring (APM), IoT telemetry, smart energy grid management, financial market tick data tracking, and scientific experimental measurements.

Within telemetry and systems monitoring, time series database systems must ingest and index massive streams of sensor or metric data in real time. To support downstream analytical workflows, these databases natively execute continuous queries and support analytical tasks such as data exploration, real-time anomaly detection, predictive trend analysis, and database gap-filling or missing-value recovery.

== Analysis and machine learning ==
Time series databases frequently serve as the underlying storage and retrieval engines for downstream analytical pipelines, including forecasting, real-time anomaly detection, missing-value imputation, and pattern matching. To optimize performance and reduce data transfer overhead, certain modern time series systems support in-database analytics by embedding machine-learning functions directly into the database layer. This architecture allows operations to invoke forecasting or outlier detection algorithms natively through standard database query interfaces, such as specialized SQL extensions.

Research in temporal data science increasingly utilizes large, pre-trained time series foundation models for complex forecasting and classification tasks. Within computer science literature, these deep learning architectures are classified strictly as algorithmic analysis methodologies applied to temporal datasets, rather than native, defining characteristics of the underlying database engine architecture.

== List of time series databases ==
The following database systems have functionality optimized for handling time series data.

Name	License	Language	References
Apache IoTDB	Apache License 2.0	Java	
Apache Kudu	Apache License 2.0	C++	
Apache Pinot	Apache License 2.0	Java	
ClickHouse	Apache License 2.0	C++	
CrateDB	Apache License 2.0	Java	
eXtremeDB	Commercial	SQL, Python, C / C++, Java, and C#	
FAME (database)	Commercial	C	
InfluxDB	MIT. Chronograf AGPLv3, Clustering Commercial	Go (version 2), Rust (version 3)	
Informix TimeSeries	Commercial	C / C++	
Kx kdb+	Commercial	Q	
MongoDB	Server Side Public License (SSPL) v1.0	C++	
Prometheus	Apache License 2.0	Go	
QuestDB	Apache License 2.0	Java, C++, Rust	
Riak-TS	Apache License 2.0	Erlang	
RRDtool	GPLv2	C	
TimescaleDB	Apache License 2.0	C	
Whisper (Graphite)	Apache License 2.0	Python	

== See also ==
- Operational historian
- Delta encoding
  - Differential backup
