= Icinga =

Monitoring software

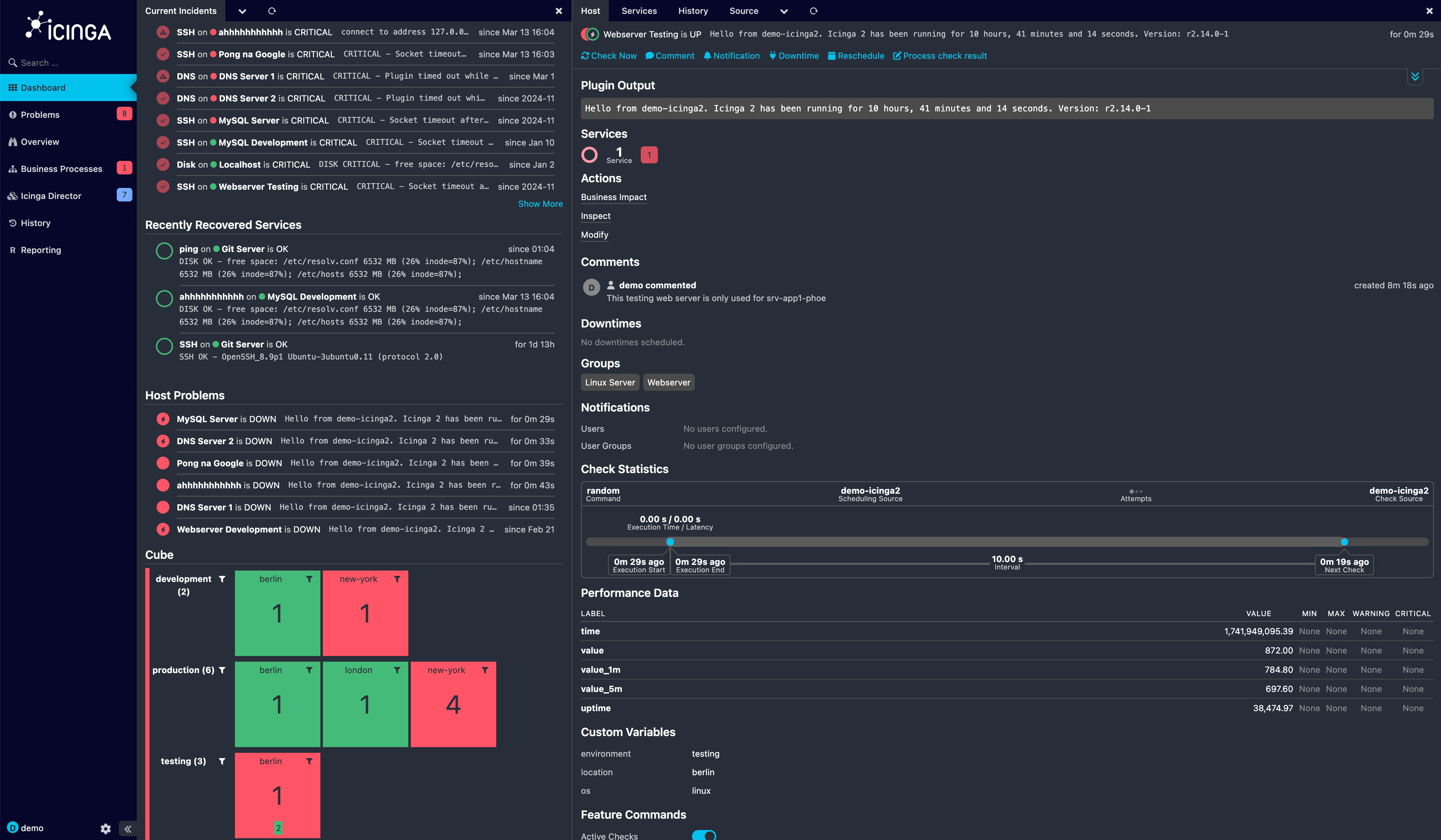
- Screenshot of Icinga 2.14.0
- Release: May 2009
- Stable release: 2.16.6 (Icinga 2) / 28 October 2026; 4 days ago
- Written in: C++, PHP
- Operating system: Cross-platform (master on Linux only)
- Type: Network monitoring
- License: GPLv2
- Website: icinga.com
- Repository: github.com/Icinga/icinga2

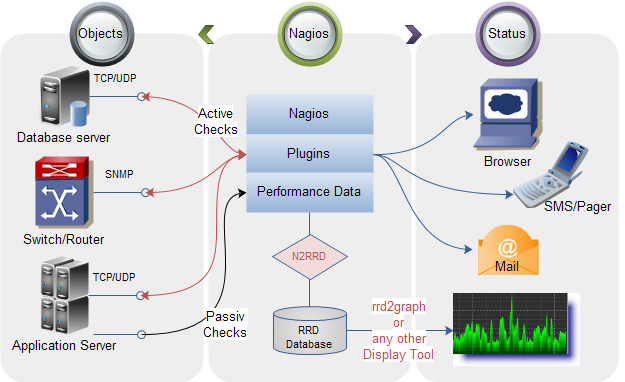
Operating principle of Nagios

Icinga is an open-source computer system and network monitoring application. It was created as a fork of the Nagios system monitoring application in 2009 in an attempt to improve on Nagios' development process. The first stable version, 1.0, was released in December 2009. In 2010 it was described as offering better database connectors, web interface, and API than Nagios.

In 2012, development of a new core component was started and released in 2014 as Icinga 2 to allow for profound architectural changes compared to the Nagios core.

== History ==
In May 2009, a group of developers from the Nagios community announced the fork Icinga, citing their dissatisfaction with the stagnant development of the Nagios software at the time and their desire to open its development to a broader base. The name Icinga is a Zulu word meaning "it looks for", "it browses" or "it examines" and is pronounced with a click consonant.

In their first year, Icinga developers released separate versions of Core, API, and Web, and celebrated their 10,000th download.

In its second year, the Icinga project released unified and stable Core and Web; added dual-stack IPv6 and IPv4 support, optimized database connectivity, and revamped the Icinga Web user interface, integrating various community add-ons (PNP4Nagios, LConf, Heatmap and Business Process Addon). The project achieved more than 70,000 downloads and grew to 23 team members.

In their second year, Icinga celebrated their 100,000th download, integrated the Icinga API component into Icinga Web, improved SLA reporting; and extended the Icinga virtual appliances to the Debian, OpenSUSE and CentOS operating systems.

In October 2012, the Icinga project released a technology preview of Icinga 2. It was a core framework replacement and parallel development branch. The developers said they want to rewrite the core to fix problems. These include the complicated setup and scalability limits in big deployments. They plan to rewrite the Icinga 2 core in C++ and design a new component loader architecture. They also plan to change how monitoring checks run.

In June 2014, the Icinga project released the first stable release of Icinga 2. New features, such as an agent or API feature, are scheduled for later releases.

== Features ==
Due to its nature as a fork, Icinga offers Nagios’ features with some additions such as optional reporting module with improved SLA accuracy, additional database connectors for PostgreSQL and Oracle, and distributed systems for redundant monitoring. Icinga also maintains configuration and plug-in compatibility with Nagios, facilitating migration between the two monitoring software.

=== Monitoring ===
- Monitoring of network services (SMTP, POP3, HTTP, NNTP, ping, etc.)
- Monitoring of host resources (CPU load, disk usage, etc.)
- Monitoring of server components (switches, routers, temperature and humidity sensors, etc.)
- Simple plug-in design that allows users to easily develop their own service checks
- Parallelized service checks
- Ability to define network host hierarchy using “parent” hosts, allowing detection of and distinction between hosts that are down and those that are unreachable
- Ability to define event handlers to be run during service or host events for proactive problem resolution

=== Notification ===
- Notification of contact persons when service or host problems occur and get resolved (via email, pager, instant message, or user-defined method)
- Escalation of alerts to other users or communication channels

=== Visualisation & reporting ===
- Two optional user interfaces (Icinga Classic UI and Icinga Web) for visualization of host and service status, network maps, reports, logs, etc.
- Icinga Reporting module based on open source Jasper Reports for both Icinga Classic and Icinga Web user interfaces
- Template-based reports (e.g. Top 10 problematic hosts or services, synopsis of complete monitoring environment, availability reports, etc.)
- Report repository with varying access levels and automated report generation and distribution
- Optional extension for SLA reporting that distinguishes between critical events from planned and unplanned downtime and acknowledgment periods
- Capacity utilization reporting
- Performance graphing via add-ons such as PNP4Nagios, NagiosGrapher, and InGraph

== Architecture ==
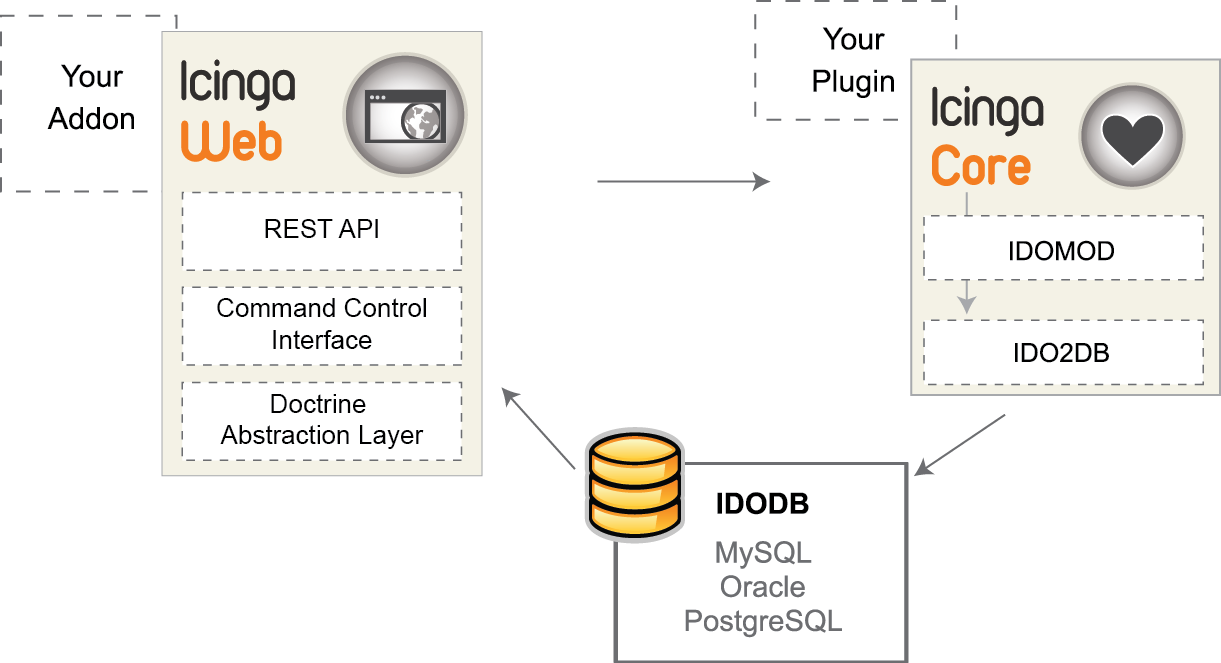
Icinga modular architecture with Core, Icinga Data Out Database, Web as of v1.5

Icinga Core is written in C and has a modular architecture with a standalone core, user interface, and database on which users can integrate various add-ons and plug-ins.

The latter communicates via Icinga's Doctrine abstraction layer, REST and plug-in APIs that mediate between the external data and internal structures. This bundling of components allows users to distribute Icinga's system for redundant monitoring. It also offers users the freedom to customize Icinga to suit their needs.

=== Icinga Core ===
The Icinga Core manages monitoring tasks, receiving check results from various plug-ins. It then communicates these results to the IDODB (Icinga Data Out Database) through the IDOMOD (Icinga Data Out Module) interface and the IDO2DB (Icinga Data Out to Database) service daemon over SSL-encrypted TCP sockets. Though both come packaged (also known as IDOUtils) with the core, they are single-standing components that can be separated to distribute the data and processes across multiple servers for distributed system monitoring.

The Icinga Classic user interface also comes packaged with Icinga Core and can be used as a substitute for the PHP-based Icinga Web interface.

=== Icinga 2 ===
Icinga 2 manages monitoring tasks, running checks, and sending alert notifications. The Icinga 2 features can be enabled on-demand, be it default features such as the 'checker' or 'notification' component, or external interfaces compatible with Icinga 1.x and its user interfaces, for example, the IDO DB (Icinga Data Out Database). Icinga 2 ships a built-in cluster stack secured by SSL x509 certificates attempting to make distributed monitoring setups more easy.

The configuration syntax is different for Icinga Core 1.x and Nagios and requires a migration on upgrade.

=== Icinga's User Interface ===
Icinga offers a web interface for users to view monitoring results and send commands to the Icinga Core, called Icinga Web (also referred to as New Web) is the projective and PHP based, Web 2.0 inspired front end that uses Cronks (widgets) to offer drag-n-drop customized dashboards. Icinga Web is a standalone piece, of software. It communicates to the core, database, and 3rd party add-ons the thrinput/dmponent layers: Doctrine abstraction, layer the (Input/Database), REST API (external scripts) and Command Control Interface (writing to a pipe, executing commands).

The interface presents information on host and service status, history, notifications, and status maps to show the health of a network in real-time and also supports IPv4 as well as IPv6 addresses.

=== Icinga Data Out Database ===
The Icinga Data Out Database (IDODB) is a storage point for historical monitoring data for add-ons or the Icinga Web interface to access. In contrast to its predecessor Nagios, Icinga supports PostgreSQL and Oracle databases in addition to MySQL.

=== Icinga Reporting ===
The Icinga project offers an optional Icinga Reporting module based on the open source Jasper Reports. It can be integrated into both Icinga Classic and Icinga Web user interfaces. The module provides template-based reports (e.g., Top 10 problematic hosts or services, synopsis of complete monitoring environment, availability reports, etc.) that can be saved to a repository with varying access levels and automated report generation and distribution. Reports can also be viewed in both of Icinga's optional user interfaces.

=== Icinga Mobile ===
Icinga Mobile is a user interface for smartphones and tablet browsers that run on WebKit. These usually are available on iOS, Android, BlackBerry Tablet OS and webOS. Based on JavaScript and Sencha Touch, Icinga Mobile is downloaded onto a server for access by authorized users via their mobile devices. Administration and updates can thus be made centrally, to automatically apply to all users of a computer network.

== Extended functionality ==
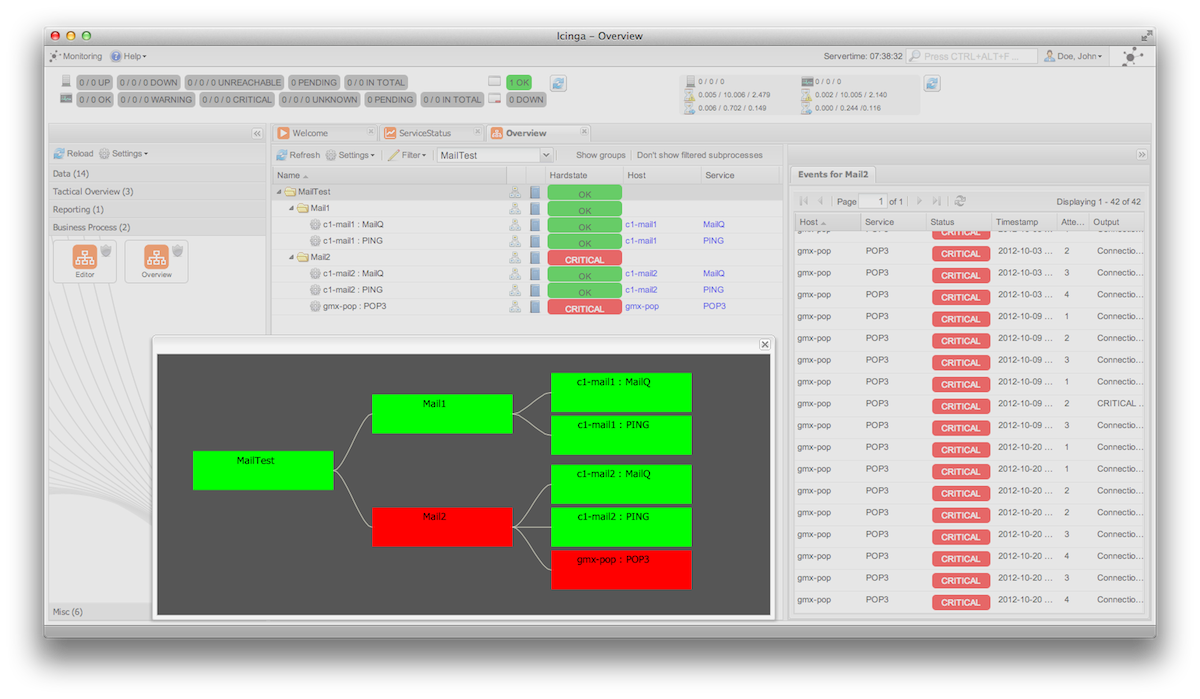
Screenshot of Icinga Web 1.8 with integrated Business Process View add-on

Some of the most popular add-ons to extend Icinga's functionality include:

- Performance graphing (e.g. PNP4Nagios, NagiosGrapher, InGraph)
- Configuration interfaces and tools (e.g. Nconf (tool for configuring Nagios), NagiosQL, LConf)
- Business process monitoring (e.g. Business Process Addons)
- Network visualization (e.g. NagVis, Nagmap)
- Windows monitoring (e.g. NSClient++, Cygwin)
- SNMP trap monitoring (e.g. SNMPTT, NagTrap)

Icinga has been deployed in distributed and failover setups. The software has modular architecture with standalone Core, Web and IDODB (Icinga Data Out Database), which provides distributed monitoring and distributed systems monitoring.

Nagios Remote Plugin Executor (NRPE) is an Icinga-compatible agent that allows remote systems monitoring using scripts that are hosted on remote systems. It allows for monitoring resources such as disk usage, system load or the number of users currently logged in. Icinga periodically polls the agent on the remote system using the check_nrpe plug-in. In setups using the optional Icinga Web user interface, monitoring data from multiple Icinga Core instances can be displayed as long as each instance writes to the same IDODB. Icinga can have its various components split and scattered in a distributed setup.

The user access, notifications, and views can be customized.

== See also ==
- Comparison of network monitoring systems
- Shinken (software) – Network monitoring software
- Pandora FMS – Software for monitoring computer networks
- NetXMS
