= List of computer standards =

Computer hardware and software standards are technical standards instituted for compatibility and interoperability between software, systems, platforms and devices.

== Hardware ==
Standard	Version	Released yyyy-mm-dd
AC'97	2.3	2002-04
ACPI	5.0	2011-11-23
AGP	3.0	1999
AHCI	1.3	2008-06-26
Advanced Power Management (APM)	1.2	1996-02
AT Attachment	ATA/ATAPI-7	2005
ATX	2.3	2007-03
BIOS Boot Specification	1.01	1996-01
BIOS Enhanced Disk Drive Specification (INT 13H)	3.0	1998-04-20
Bluetooth	5.0	2010-06-30
Boot Integrity Services API	1.0	1998-12-28
BTX Chassis Design Guidelines	1.1	2007-02
BTX Interface Specification	1.0b	2005-07
BTX System Design Guide	1.1	2007-02-20
Chassis Air Guide (CAG)	1.1	2003-09
CompactFlash (CF)	5.0	2010
Common Building Block (for notebooks)		2005
Desktop and mobile Architecture for System Hardware (DASH)	1.1	2007-12
Desktop Management Interface (DMI)	2.0.1s	2003-01-10
DDC/CI	1.1	2004-10
DisplayPort	1.2	2009-12-22
DVI	1.0	1999-04-02
Enhanced Display Data Channel (E-DDC)	1.2	2007-12-26
Double data rate synchronous dynamic random access memory (DDR SDRAM)	JESD79-3	
Display Power Management Signaling (DPMS)	1.0	1993
El Torito	1.0	1995-01-25
Energy Star	5.0	2008-11-14
Extended Industry Standard Architecture (EISA)		
Enthusiast System Architecture (ESA)	1.0	2007
Extensible Firmware Interface (EFI)	1.10	2002-12-01
Embedded Technology eXtended (ETX)	3.02	2007-01-22
EDID	2.0	
FireWire (IEEE 1394)	1394-2008	2007-12
Floating point (IEEE 754)	754-2008	1985
HDMI	1.4	2009-05-28
HyperTransport (HT)	3.1	2008-07-23
I²C	03	2007-06-19
I2O		1996
Industry Standard Architecture (ISA)		
Integrated Drive Electronics (IDE, ATA/ATAPI, PATA)		
Intelligent Platform Management Interface (IPMI)	2.0	2004-02-14
Micro Channel Architecture (MCA)		
MultiProcessor Specification (MPS)	1.4	1995-07-01
NVM Express	1.0	2011-03-01
ONFI	2.2	2009-10
PCI	3.0	2002-08-12
PC Card	8.0	2001-04
PCI-X	2.0	2003
PCI Express (PCIe)	4.0	2010-11-18
PMBus	1.1	
POST Memory Manager (PMM)	1.01	1997-11-21
Preboot Execution Environment (PXE)	2.1	1999-09-20
RAID		1980's
Small Computer System Interface SCSI		
Serial ATA (SATA)	3.1	2011-07-18
Shuttle PCB Assembly (SPA) for notebook motherboards		2010
Simple Boot Flag Specification	2.1	2005-01-28
Simple Firmware Interface (SFI)	0.7	2009-07-31
System Management BIOS (SMBIOS)	2.7.1	2011-02-01
System Management Bus (SMBus)	2.0	2000-08-03
Trusted Platform Module (TPM)	2.0	2015
TWAIN	2.1	2009-08-08
VESA BIOS Extensions (VBE)	3.0	1998-09-16
UEFI Platform Initialization (PI) specification	1.2	2009-05
Unified Extensible Firmware Interface (UEFI) specification	2.3.1	2011-04-08
UEFI Shell Specification	2.0	2008-10-08
Unified Display Interface (UDI)	1.0	
Universal Serial Bus (USB)	4.0	2019

== Software ==
Standard	Version	Released
American Standard Code for Information Interchange		
Atom	1.0	
Cascading Style Sheets (CSS)	2.1	2007-07-19
COLLADA	1.5.0	2008-08
Common Information Model (CIM)	2.22	2009-06-25
Common Gateway Interface (CGI)	1.1	
DocBook	5.0	
ECMAScript	5.1	2011-06
Executable and Linking Format (ELF)	1.2	
File Transfer Protocol (FTP)		
Filesystem Hierarchy Standard (FHS)	2.3	2004-01-29
HTML	5.2	2017-12-14
HTML	ISO/IEC 15445:2000, ISO HTML, based on 4.01 Strict	2000-05
HTTP	1.1	1999-06
ICC profile	4.2	2004-10
JSON	ECMA-404	2013
Linux Standard Base (LSB)	4.0	2008-11-11
MathML	2.0	2003-10
Message Passing Interface (MPI)	2.2	2009-09-04
Metalink	4.0	2010-06
Multiboot Specification	0.6.96	2009
OAuth	1.0	2007-10-03
OEmbed	1.0	2008-03-21
Office Open XML	1.0	2006-12
OpenAL	1.1	2007-07-12
OpenCL	1.1	2010-06-11
OpenDocument (ODF)	1.2	2011-09-30
OpenEXR	1.6.1	2007-10-22
OpenGL	4.0	2010-03-11
OpenGL ES	2.0	2007-03
OpenML	1.0	
OpenSL ES	1.0.1	2009-09-24
OpenVG	1.1	2008-12-09
OpenWF	1.0	2009-11-09
Open XML Paper Specification	First Edition	2009-06-16
Portable Document Format (PDF)	2.0	1993-06-15
Portable Network Graphics (PNG)	1.2	1999-08-11
POSIX	IEEE Std 1003.1-2024	1988
PostScript	3	1997
RenderMan (RISpec)	3.2.1	2005-11
Rich Text Format (RTF)	1.9.1	2008-03
RSS	2.0	2002-09
Security Assertion Markup Language (SAML)	2.0	2005-03
Scalable Vector Graphics (SVG)	1.2T	2006-08-10
Simple Network Management Protocol (SNMP)	3	2004
Single UNIX Specification (SUS)	3	2002-01-30
SOAP	1.2	2003-06-24
Standard Configuration File Format		1991
Storage Management Initiative - Specification (SMI-S)	1.1.0	2005
Synchronized Multimedia Integration Language (SMIL)	2.1	2005-12-13
SyncML	1.1	2002-04-02
SQL	SQL:2016	2016
Transport Layer Security (TLS)	1.2	2008-08
Unified Modeling Language (UML)	2.3	2010-05
Unicode	16.0	1991-10
Universal 3D (U3D)	ECMA-363 4th edition	2007-06
Universal Disk Format (UDF)	2.60	2005-03-01
WebGL	1.0	2011-03-03
Wireless Application Protocol (WAP)	2.0	2002-11-06
Wireless Markup Language (WML)	2.0	2001
XHTML	1.1	2001-05-31
XML	1.1	2004-02-04
Open Neural Network Exchange (ONNX)	1.7	2019

== See also ==
- List of RFCs
- List of device bandwidths
- Comparison of wireless data standards
- Information security standards
