= Mark Carlson (engineer) =

Mark A. Carlson (born 1955) was a software engineer known in the systems management industry for his work in management standards and technology. Mark was the first employee of a small startup in Boulder, Colorado called Redcape Policy Software. Sun Microsystems acquired the company and its technology in 1998 and subsequently promoted it as Jiro, a common management framework based on Java and Jini.

Carlson was best known for his work on the development of a storage management standard called SMI-S for the SNIA, serving as the chair of the group overseeing the specification for several years. The specification is now an ANSI and ISO standard.

In addition to SMI-S, Mark also led the development of a reference implementation of the XAM standard, a next generation storage interface with support for metadata, query and compliance based data retention of fixed content. Based on this work, he authored the Storage Industry Resource Domain Model, a model for Computer data storage interfaces showing the role of system metadata for future integrated Data Services orchestrated by policy.

Carlson has led various efforts around Policy Based Management, including co-authoring RFC 3198 and chairing of the DMTF and SNIA policy working groups. He was a core contributor on the Apache incubator project called Imperius, which is an implementation of the standard CIM-SPL policy language.

Mark's most recent efforts were to lead the development of a standard cloud storage interface leveraging the preceding storage and data management technologies. As chair of the SNIA Cloud Storage Technical Work Group, he was driving the development of the Cloud Data Management Interface (CDMI) and a reference implementation of the interface.

He served on the SNIA Technical Council. He was also appointed as a DMTF Fellow for the Distributed Management Task Force (DMTF).

== Death ==
Mark died unexpectedly May 3, 2023. More information is available on his SNIA Memorial webpage and his family memorial webpage.
