= WQL =

Microsoft's implementation of the CIM Query Language

- Family: Query language
- Developer: Microsoft
- OS: Microsoft Windows

Influenced by
- SQL

Windows Management Instrumentation Query Language (WQL) is Microsoft's implementation of the CIM Query Language (CQL), a query language for the Common Information Model (CIM) standard from the Distributed Management Task Force (DMTF). It is a subset of ANSI standard SQL with minor semantic changes.

WQL is dedicated to WMI and is designed to perform queries against the CIM repository to retrieve information or get event notifications.

== Example ==
As an example, the following WQL query selects all the drives on a computer that have less than 2 MB of free space:

SELECT * FROM Win32_LogicalDisk WHERE FreeSpace < 2097152

== See also ==
- Windows Management Instrumentation (WMI)
- Common Information Model (CIM)
- Web-Based Enterprise Management (WBEM)
- Windows PowerShell
