= Desktop Management Interface =

Standard for managing components in computers

- Abbreviation: DMI
- Status: Superseded by CIM
- Year started: 1994; 32 years ago
- Organization: Distributed Management Task Force
- Base standards: SMBIOS, WBEM, WS-Management
- Domain: Desktop management
- Website: www.dmtf.org/standards/dmi

The Desktop Management Interface (DMI) generates a standard framework for managing and tracking components in a desktop, notebook or server computer, by abstracting these components from the software that manages them. The development of DMI, 2.0 version June 24, 1998, marked the first move by the Distributed Management Task Force (DMTF) into desktop-management standards. Before the introduction of DMI, no standardized source of information could provide details about components in a personal computer.

Due to the rapid development of DMTF technologies, such as Common Information Model (CIM), the DMTF defined an "End of Life" process for DMI, which ended on March 31, 2005.

From 1999, Microsoft required OEMs and BIOS vendors to support the DMI interface/data-set in order to have Microsoft certification.

== DMI and SMBIOS ==
DMI exposes system data -including the System Management BIOS (SMBIOS)- data to management software, but the two specifications function independently.

DMI is commonly confused with SMBIOS, which was actually called DMIBIOS in its first revisions.

== Optional additional services: MIF data and MIF routines ==
When software queries a memory-resident agent that resides in the background, it responds by sending data in MIFs (Management Information Format) or activating MIF routines. Static data in a MIF would contain items such as model ID, serial number, memory- and port-addresses. A MIF routine could read memory and report its contents.

== DMI and SNMP ==
DMI can co-exist with SNMP and other management protocols. For example, when an SNMP query arrives, DMI can fill out the SNMP MIB with data from its MIF. A single workstation or server can serve as a proxy agent that would contain the SNMP module and service an entire LAN segment of DMI-capable machines.

== See also ==
- dmidecode
- Desktop management
- lspci
- System Management BIOS
- Web-Based Enterprise Management (WBEM)
- WS-Management
