= System Management BIOS =

Computing specification

- Abbreviation: SMBIOS
- Status: Published
- Year started: 1999; 27 years ago
- Latest version: 3.9.0; August 19, 2025; 7 months ago
- Organization: Distributed Management Task Force (DMTF)
- Related standards: Common Information Model (CIM), Web-Based Enterprise Management (WBEM), Redfish
- Domain: Systems management
- Website: www.dmtf.org/standards/smbios

In computing, the System Management BIOS (SMBIOS) specification defines data structures (and access methods) that can be used to read management information produced by the BIOS of a computer. This eliminates the need for the operating system to probe hardware directly to discover what devices are present in the computer. The SMBIOS specification is produced by the Distributed Management Task Force (DMTF), a non-profit standards development organization. The DMTF estimates that two billion client and server systems implement SMBIOS.

SMBIOS was originally known as Desktop Management BIOS (DMIBIOS), since it interacted with the Desktop Management Interface (DMI).

== History ==
Version 1 of the Desktop Management BIOS (DMIBIOS) specification was produced by Phoenix Technologies in or before 1996.

Version 2.0 of the Desktop Management BIOS specification was released on March 6, 1996 by American Megatrends (AMI), Award Software, Dell, Intel, Phoenix Technologies, and SystemSoft Corporation. It introduced 16-bit plug-and-play functions used to access the structures from Windows 95.

The last version to be published directly by vendors was 2.3 on August 12, 1998. The authors were American Megatrends, Award Software, Compaq, Dell, Hewlett-Packard, Intel, International Business Machines (IBM), Phoenix Technologies, and SystemSoft Corporation.

Circa 1999, the Distributed Management Task Force (DMTF) took ownership of the specification. The first version published by the DMTF was 2.3.1 on March 16, 1999. At approximately the same time Microsoft started to require that OEMs and BIOS vendors support the interface/data-set in order to have Microsoft certification.

Version 3.0.0, introduced in February 2015, added a 64-bit entry point, which can coexist with the previously defined 32-bit entry point.

The latest version 3.9.0 was released in August 2025.

== Contents ==
The SMBIOS table consists of an entry point (two types are defined, 32-bit and 64-bit), and a variable number of structures that describe platform components and features. These structures are occasionally referred to as "tables" or "records" in third-party documentation.

=== Structure types ===
As of version 3.3.0, the SMBIOS specification defines the following structure types:

Type	Description
0	BIOS Information
1	System Information
2	Baseboard (or Module) Information
3	System Enclosure or Chassis
4	Processor Information
5	Memory Controller Information (Obsolete)
6	Memory Module Information (Obsolete)
7	Cache Information
8	Port Connector Information
9	System Slots
10	On Board Devices Information
11	OEM Strings
12	System Configuration Options
13	BIOS Language Information
14	Group Associations
15	System Event Log
16	Physical Memory Array
17	Memory Device
18	32-Bit Memory Error Information
19	Memory Array-Mapped Address
20	Memory Device-Mapped Address
21	Built-in Pointing Device
22	Portable Battery
23	System Reset
24	Hardware Security
25	System Power Controls
26	Voltage Probe
27	Cooling Device
28	Temperature Probe
29	Electrical Current Probe
30	Out-of-Band Remote Access
31	Boot Integrity Services (BIS) Entry Point
32	System Boot Information
33	64-Bit Memory Error Information
34	Management Device
35	Management Device Component
36	Management Device Threshold Data
37	Memory Channel
38	IPMI Device Information
39	System Power Supply
40	Additional Information
41	Onboard Devices Extended Information
42	Management Controller Host Interface
43	TPM Device
44	Processor Additional Information
126	Inactive
127	End-of-Table
128–255	Available for system- and OEM- specific information
129	Intel ASF
130	Intel AMT
131	Intel Management Engine

== Accessing SMBIOS data ==
The EFI configuration table (EFI_CONFIGURATION_TABLE) contains entries pointing to the SMBIOS 2 and/or SMBIOS 3 tables. There are several ways to access the data, depending on the platform and operating system.

=== From UEFI ===
In the UEFI Shell, the SmbiosView command can retrieve and display the SMBIOS data. One can often enter the UEFI shell by entering the system firmware settings, and then selecting the shell as a boot option (as opposed to a DVD drive or hard drive).

=== From Unix ===
For Linux, FreeBSD, etc., the dmidecode utility can be used.

=== From Windows ===
Microsoft specifies WMI as the preferred mechanism for accessing SMBIOS information from Microsoft Windows.

On Windows systems that support it (XP and later), some SMBIOS information can be viewed with either the WMIC utility with 'BIOS'/'MEMORYCHIP'/'BASEBOARD' and similar parameters, or by looking in the Windows Registry under HKLM\HARDWARE\DESCRIPTION\System.

Various software utilities can retrieve raw SMBIOS data, including AIDA64, FirmwareTablesView and SMBIOS Decoder.

== Generating SMBIOS data ==
Table and structure creation is normally up to the system firmware/BIOS. The UEFI Platform Initialization (PI) specification includes an SMBIOS protocol (EFI_SMBIOS_PROTOCOL) that allows components to submit SMBIOS structures for inclusion, and enables the producer to create the SMBIOS table for a platform.

Platform virtualization software can also generate SMBIOS tables for use inside VMs, for instance QEMU.

If the SMBIOS data is not generated and filled correctly then the machine may behave unexpectedly. For example, a Mini PC that advertises Chassis Information | Type = Tablet may behave unexpectedly using Linux. A desktop manager like GNOME will attempt to monitor a non-existent battery and shut down the screen and network interfaces when the missing battery drops below a threshold. Additionally, if the Chassis Information | Manufacturer is not filled in correctly then work-arounds for the incorrect Type = Tablet problem cannot be applied.

== See also ==
- Web-Based Enterprise Management (WBEM)
