= MIF =

MIF may refer to:

== Computing ==
- Maker Interchange Format, a markup language used by Adobe FrameMaker
- Management Information Format, a format used to describe a hardware or software component
- MapInfo Interchange Format, a map and database exporting file format of MapInfo

== Finance ==
- Maharlika Investment Fund, a sovereign wealth fund in the Philippines
- Master in Finance
- Multilateral Investment Fund, an independent fund administered by the Inter-American Development Bank

== Medicine ==
- Macrophage migration inhibitory factor, a protein involved in immune response.
- Müllerian inhibiting factor, a hormone that plays a role in the sexual differentiation of humans
- Merthiolate-Iodine-Formaldehyde, a solution used in biomedical laboratories

== Science and technology ==
- Magnetized Inertial Fusion, a method of generating energy
- Mass-independent fractionation, any chemical or physical process that acts to separate isotopes
- Maximal intersecting family, in mathematics
- Metal–inorganic framework

== Other uses ==
- Anthony J. Mifsud, Maltese-born Canadian actor, singer and songwriter, performs professionally under the moniker Mif
- Manchester International Festival, an arts festival held in Manchester, England
- Miners' International Federation, former global union federation
