= WRM =

WRM may refer to:

- Wareham railway station in Dorset, England (National Rail station code)
- Western Railway Museum in Sacramento, California
- Westmeath Rifle Militia, an Irish Militia regiment raised in County Westmeath
- West Richmond railway station, Melbourne
- W. Ross Macdonald School in Brantford, Ontario, Canada
- WRM Motors of Oxford, an aircraft manufacturing company in Oxford, England
- World Rainforest Movement, an environmentalist group based in Uruguay
- Wira Replacement Model, an early working title for the Proton Gen-2, a Malaysian car
- The White Rose Movement, a youth resistance group fighting Nazi Germany during World War II
- White Rose Movement, a British post-punk band
- Windows Rights Management (Services), a Digital rights management technology for Microsoft Windows.
- Windows Remote Management, a Microsoft Windows implementation of WS-Management Protocol based on SOAP (Simple Object Access Protocol)
- White Resistance Manual, neo-Nazi terrorist handbook
