= WBEM =

WBEM may refer to:

- WBEM (AM), a former American radio station
- Web-Based Enterprise Management, in computing
  - WBEM Services Specification, a Java Specification Request

== See also ==
- WebM, an audio-video container for use with HTML5 video
