= Smis =

SMIS is a four-letter abbreviation that may refer to:

== Systems ==
- Structures Management Information System - a Highways Agency (UK) system for inventory and defect management of the structures.
- Strategic Management Information Systems

== Standards ==
- Storage Management Initiative - Specification

== Educational institutions ==
- St. Mary's International School
- St. Michael's International School
