= Jon Mittelhauser =

Internet pioneer

Jon E. Mittelhauser (born May 1970) is a software executive who co-wrote the Windows version of NCSA Mosaic and was a founder of Netscape.

== Education ==
Mittelhauser attended the University of Illinois at Urbana-Champaign, where he joined the Alpha Sigma Phi fraternity and graduated with a Bachelor of Science degree in Computer Science in 1992 and a master's degree in 1994.

== Career ==
In 1993, as a graduate student, he co-wrote NCSA Mosaic for Windows with fellow student Chris Wilson while working at the National Center for Supercomputing Applications (NCSA). Mittelhauser was part of the original team of five programmers of Mosaic with Marc Andreessen and Eric Bina (Unix version), Aleks Totic (Mac version) and Chris Wilson (Windows version). The Windows version that Mittelhauser and Wilson wrote was the first browser with over a million downloads and is often characterized as the first widely used web browser. Mittelhauser is considered a founding father of the browser.

After leaving the University of Illinois in 1994, Mittelhauser became one of the founders of Netscape Communications Corporation.

His next position was Director of Engineering for Geocast Network Systems, a start-up funded by Mayfield Fund, Kleiner Perkins Caufield & Byers, and Institutional Venture Partners.

Mittelhauser led the software organization at OnLive, Inc. and managed their successful launch in 2010. He left at the end of that year as VP of Engineering and joined their Technical Advisory Board.

In May 2012 he became Vice President of Engineering for Nebula, Inc.

From December 2014 to December 2016, he was chief executive officer of the software company that develops CloudBolt.

As of July 2018 he was Vice President of the Container Native Group at Oracle Corporation.

== Personal life ==
Mittelhauser has two daughters and lives in Silicon Valley. In 1999 he opened The Basin restaurant in Saratoga with fellow Netscape-er Bill Foss.
