= Open Management Infrastructure =

Open-source CIM/WBEM Information Management Model

- Other names: NanoWBEM
- Original authors: Microsoft, The Open Group
- Developer: Microsoft
- Release: June 28, 2012; 14 years ago
- Stable release: 1.9.0 / April 2, 2024; 2 years ago
- Written in: C
- Operating system: Linux, Unix
- Platform: IA-32, x86-64
- Standard: CIM
- Type: System configuration application
- License: Apache License 2.0, MIT License
- Website: collaboration.opengroup.org/omi/
- Repository: github.com/Microsoft/omi

The Open Management Infrastructure stack (OMI, formerly known as NanoWBEM) is a free and open-source Common Information Model (CIM) management server sponsored by The Open Group and made available under the Apache License 2.0.

== Overview ==
OMI was contributed to The Open Group by Microsoft on June 28, 2012, with the goal "to remove all obstacles that stand in the way of implementing standards-based management so that every device in the world can be managed in a clear, consistent, coherent way and to nurture [and] spur a rich ecosystem of standards-based management products." The source code is hosted on GitHub.

== See also ==
- Windows Remote Management
