= Cloud platform =

Cloud platform may refer to:

Computing

- Google Cloud Platform
- a platform for Cloud computing
- Oracle Cloud Platform
- Fujitsu Global Cloud Platform
- Xen Cloud Platform
- NIWA Cloud Application Platform

Places

- Cloud Platform at Juyongguan, a 14th-century Buddhist structure at Beijing, China
