= Intorel =

Visionic
- Developer: The Intorel Company
- Stable release: 5.0 / September 6, 2011
- Preview release: 4.98 / September 8, 2010
- Operating system: Microsoft Windows
- Platform: .NET
- Type: Monitoring Control Network management
- License: Commercial
- Website: www.intorel.com

Visionic is a network management computer system and network monitoring software application produced by Intorel. In 2002, Intorel launched the first version of later to become its flagship product - Visionic.
