= IHV =

IHV is a three-letter acronym that may refer to:

- The Institute of Human Virology
- An independent hardware vendor
- Institute of Health Visiting
- Ice Hockey Victoria
