= Service (business) =

Subset of economic services

Business services are a recognisable subset of economic services, and share their characteristics. The essential difference is that businesses are concerned about the building of service systems in order to deliver value to their customers and to act in the roles of service provider and service consumer.

A service is a set of one-time consumable and perishable benefits that are: delivered from the accountable service provider, mostly in close co-action with their internal and external service suppliers; effectuated by distinct functions of technical systems and by distinct activities of individuals, respectively; commissioned according to the needs of his/her service consumers by the service customer from the accountable service provider; rendered individually to a consumer at their dedicated trigger or request; and, finally, consumed and utilized by the triggering service consumer for executing their upcoming business or private activity.

== Service specification ==
Any service can be clearly and completely, consistently and concisely specified by means of the following 12 standard attributes which conform to the MECE principle (mutually exclusive, collectively exhaustive):

== Service-commodity goods continuum ==
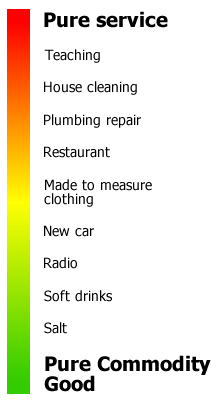
Service-Commodity Goods continuum

There has been a long academic debate on what makes services different from goods. The historical perspective in the late-eighteen and early-nineteenth centuries focused on creation and possession of wealth. Classical economists contended that goods were objects of value over which ownership rights could be established and exchanged. Ownership implied tangible possession of an object that had been acquired through purchase, barter or gift from the producer or previous owner and was legally identifiable as the property of the current owner.

Adam Smith’s book The Wealth of Nations, published in Great Britain in 1776, distinguished between the outputs of what he termed "productive" and "unproductive" labor. The former, he stated, produced goods that could be stored after production and subsequently exchanged for money or other items of value. The latter, however useful or necessary, created services that perished at the time of production and therefore did not contribute to wealth. Building on this theme, French economist Jean-Baptiste Say argued that production and consumption were inseparable in services, coining the term "immaterial products" to describe them.

Most modern business theorists see a continuum with pure service on one terminal point and pure commodity good on the other terminal point. Most products fall between these two extremes. For example, a restaurant provides a physical good (the food), but also provides services in the form of ambience, the setting and clearing of the table, etc. And although some utilities actually deliver physical goods — like water utilities which actually deliver water — utilities are usually treated as services.

In a narrower sense, service refers to quality of customer service: the measured appropriateness of assistance and support provided to a customer. This particular usage occurs frequently in retailing.

== Economic services ==
Economic services that are recognised in practice are listed in economic services.

== See also ==
- Application service provider
- Ecosystem services
- Enterprise service management
- Service governance
- IT service management
- Service economy
