= Desktop and mobile Architecture for System Hardware =

Protocol standard for out-of-band management

Desktop and Mobile Architecture for System Hardware
- Abbreviation: DASH
- Status: Published
- Year started: 2007; 18 years ago
- Latest version: 1.2; June 2015; 10 years ago
- Organization: Distributed Management Task Force
- Related standards: WS-Management
- Domain: Systems management
- Website: www.dmtf.org/standards/dash

Desktop and mobile Architecture for System Hardware (DASH) is a Distributed Management Task Force (DMTF) standard.

== Description ==
In April 2007 the Desktop and Mobile Working Group (DMWG) of the DMTF started work on an implementation requirements specification (DSP0232). Version, DASH 1.1, was published in December 2007 and became a DMTF standard in June 2009. Version, DASH 1.2, was published in December 2014 and became standard in June 2015.

In-service and out-of-service systems can be managed, with manageability aligned between the modes, independent of operating system state. Both HTTP and HTTPS management ports are supported: TCP ports 623 and 664, respectively, for connections from remote management consoles to DASH out-of-band management access points (MAP).

The DMTF Common Information Model (CIM) schema defines the supported DASH management data and operations. There are 28 CIM profiles supported in the DASH 1.1 specification. 9 new profiles were added and 4 profiles were updated in DASH 1.2 specifications.

DASH uses the DMTF's Web Services for Management (WS-Management) protocol for communication of CIM objects and services.

The web services expose a common set of operations for system management:

- DISCOVER
- GET, PUT, CREATE and DELETE management resources, such as property values & settings
- ENUMERATE for tables and collections
- SUBSCRIBE to and DELETE events (indication delivery)
- EXECUTE for services (method invocation)

== Management access point discovery ==
Discovery of access points is a two phase process:

- Phase 1: an RMCP Presence Ping request is sent (broadcast, multicast or unicast) and an RMCP Presence Pong response is received indicating support for WS-Management.
- Phase 2: a WS-Management "Identify" request is sent and response is received indicating support for DASH, which version, and which security profiles.

== Protocols ==
DASH management protocols layers include:

Layer	Type
DASH Management Service	App
DASH CIM Profiles	App
WS-Management CIM Binding	App
Data Transfer (WS-Eventing, WS-Enum, WS-Transfer, WS-Addressing)	WS Layer
Security Profiles	WS Layer
Simple Object Access Protocol (SOAP) / XML	SOAP
HTTP/TLS	SOAP
TCP	SOAP
IP	Network
MAC/PHY

== Profiles ==
The DMTF CIM Profiles supported by the DASH 1.1 specification:

The DMTF CIM Profiles supported by the DASH 1.2 specification:

DASH is designed for desktop and mobile computer systems; a related DMTF standard for management of server computer systems is the Systems Management Architecture for Server Hardware (SMASH), with a similar set of CIM Profiles.

Intel Active Management Technology is a compliant implementation of DASH.

== See also ==
- Common Information Model (CIM)
- WS-Management
- Systems Management Architecture for Server Hardware (SMASH)
- Alert Standard Format (ASF)
- Alert on LAN
- Wake-on-LAN (WOL)
- IPMI -A server management interface standard covering similar functionality as DASH, but using a UDP-based protocol compared with the TCP/SOAP protocol of DASH. DASH can be implemented on top of IPMI.
