= DTMF (disambiguation) =

DTMF is a telephony signaling protocol.

DTMF may also refer to:

- Debí Tirar Más Fotos, a 2025 album by Bad Bunny
  - "DTMF" (song), 2025

== See also ==
- DMTF
