= Dmidecode =

Command-line utility

dmidecode
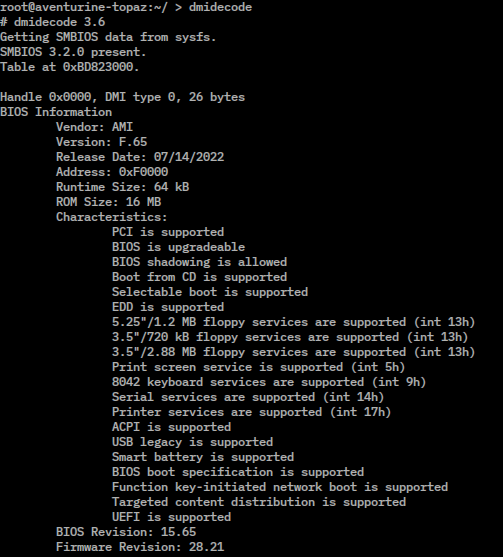
- dmidecode output
- Original author: Alan Cox
- Developer: Jean Delvare
- Stable release: 3.7 / 18 December 2025; 9 months ago
- Written in: C
- Operating system: Linux
- Included with: Ubuntu
- Standards: DMI, SMBIOS
- License: GNU General Public License version 2
- Website: www.nongnu.org/dmidecode/
- Repository: cgit.git.savannah.gnu.org/cgit/dmidecode.git

dmidecode is a free userspace command-line utility for Linux that can parse the SMBIOS data. The name dmidecode is derived from Desktop Management Interface, a related standard with which dmidecode originally interfaced. SMBIOS was originally named DMIBIOS. The Linux kernel and other modern operating systems such as the BSD family contain an SMBIOS decoder, allowing systems administrators to inspect system hardware configuration and to enable or disable certain workarounds for problems with specific systems, based on the provided SMBIOS information. Information provided by this utility typically includes the system manufacturer, model name, serial number, BIOS version and asset tag, as well other details of varying level of interest and reliability, depending on the system manufacturer. The information often includes usage status for the CPU sockets, expansion slots (including AGP, PCI and ISA) and memory module slots, and the list of I/O ports (including serial, parallel and USB). Decoded DMI tables for various computer models are collected in a public GitHub repository.

For Dell systems there is a libsmbios utility.
