= WBEM Services Specification =

Java Specification Request

JSR 48 Java WBEM API Specification is a Java Specification Request developed under the Java Community Process. It specifies the Java language binding of the DMTF Common Information Model/Web-Based Enterprise Management standards. The JSR 48 Expert Group has completed the public review in 2006 and is now on the way to create a Technology Compatibility Kit in order to finalize the standard. The API can be regarded as stable.

JSR 48 requires Java Platform, Standard Edition (Java SE; formerly J2SE) 7 or higher.

== API content ==
WS JSR-48 API The API is composed of 5 packages:

1. javax.cim — Contains the Java representations of CIM entities
2. javax.wbem — Contains WBEM entities common to all services
3. javax.wbem.client — Contains the WBEM client
4. javax.wbem.listener — Contains the WBEM indication listener
5. javax.wbem.provider — Contains the WBEM provider interface

== Implementations ==
WS provides a JSR-48 implementation as part of the WS SDK Pro, WS also uses JSR-48 for the WS J WBEM Server and WAVE (WBEM Agent Validation Environment)

The SBLIM CIM Client for Java adopted the JSR 48 API.

It has been stated that the OpenPegasus project will use JSR 48 for their JMPI provider interface, although status about this is not yet available.
