= CMPI =

CMPI may refer to:

- Center for Medicine in the Public Interest, a research group
- Common Manageability Programming Interface, an open standard in computer programming
- Community Master Patient Index, a synonym in healthcare industries for Enterprise master patient index
- Cow's Milk Protein Intolerance, see Cow's milk protein allergy
