= Common Manageability Programming Interface =

- Abbreviation: CMPI
- Status: Published
- Year started: 2004; 21 years ago
- Latest version: V2.1; February 2016; 9 years ago
- Organization: The Open Group
- Related standards: Web-Based Enterprise Management
- Domain: Application programming interfaces
- Website: www.opengroup.org/tech/management/cmpi/

The Common Manageability Programming Interface (CMPI, also called Common Management Programming Interface) is an open standard that defines a programming interface between a WBEM server and WBEM providers.

== Overview ==
The CMPI standard is defined by the CMPI Working Group of The Open Group and is implementation neutral.

The CMPI programming interface is defined for the C programming language. Its C header files are enabled for C++. In addition, there are C++ utility macros that allow accessing the interface in a way that is more typical to C++.

Each release of the cmpi specification is accompanied by a set of C-language header files that represent the implementation of the interface. Normally these files are incorporated into each of the WBEM servers that provide this interface. However, the header files are also available independently for each release.

As of CMPI 2.1, these header files are available on GitHub in the CMPI GitHub Project. Also as of CMPI 2.1 the CMIP interface documentation is also available as a GitHub website at CMPI API documentation on GitHub.

== Benefits ==
Before the introduction of CMPI, each WBEM server implementation had its own specific programming interface for CIM providers (e.g. WMI COM API, OpenPegasus C++ API, OpenWBEM C++ API, etc.). CMPI allows CIM providers to be developed that are mostly or completely agnostic to the type of WBEM server they are being used with. Therefore, CMPI providers can be deployed across a variety of operating environments with no or minimal adaptation work. This protects the investment in these CIM providers.

== Standards development ==
The original input to the CMPI standard was submitted by IBM to The Open Group in 2003. Along with the submission, an implementation was conducted as part of the SBLIM project.

In late 2004, CMPI V1.0 was released by The Open Group as a Technical Standard. A major update (V2.0 was released in late 2006). A backward compatible but significant extension of the specification was released in February 2016.

The current version of CMPI is V2.1 (released February 2016).

== List of products or projects supporting CMPI ==
Note: The following list is likely incomplete. Please help to complete the list.

=== WBEM servers ===
- OpenPegasus
- Small Footprint CIM Broker (SFCB)
- WS J WBEM Server
- OpenWBEM
- ESXi CIM broker

=== WBEM providers ===
- SBLIM CMPI providers for Linux
- XenSource CMPI providers for Xen
- CMPI providers for libvirt/KVM
- CIM support on IBM z/OS 1.10
- CIM support on IBM AIX 6.1

=== Tools ===
- Extensible CIM UML Tooling Environment (ECUTE)
- CIMPLE Provider Development Environment (SimpleWBEM)
- Konkret CMPI
- OpenDRIM C++ Template

== See also ==
- CIM
