= Y.3800 =

Computer networking standard

- Overview on networks supporting quantum key distribution
- Status: In force
- Latest version: 1.1; July 2020
- Organization: ITU-T
- Domain: telecommunication
- License: Freely available
- Website: https://www.itu.int/rec/T-REC-Y.3800/

Y.3800 is an ITU-T Recommendation (computer standard) with the long name "Overview on networks supporting quantum key distribution", that gives an overview of networks supporting quantum key distribution (QKD) cryptographic protocols.

The standard provides support for the design, deployment, operation and maintenance for the implementation of QKD networks (QKDNs), in terms of standardized technologies. It extends existing point-to-point system, and allows for QKD networks.

The relevant network aspects of conceptual structure, layered model and basic functions are within the scope of the Recommendation to support its implementation.

As of September 2020, Y.3800 as well as the related Y.3801 is the basis of QKD trials being conducted by Verizon between their 5G lab in Virginia and Washington D.C.

== Corrigendum 1 ==
Corrigendum 1 transforms 'IT-secure keys' into 'secure keys' and makes the location of a security demarcation boundary unspecified.
