= Network management =

Discipline of administering and managing computer networks

Network management is the process of administering and managing computer networks. Services provided by this discipline include fault analysis, performance management, provisioning of networks and maintaining quality of service. Network management software is used by network administrators to help perform these functions.

== Technologies ==
A number of applications and protocols exist to support network and network device management. Network management allows IT professionals to monitor network components within a large network area. Access methods include the SNMP, command-line interface (CLI), custom XML, CMIP, Windows Management Instrumentation (WMI), Transaction Language 1 (TL1), CORBA, NETCONF, RESTCONF and the Java Management Extensions (JMX).

Schemas include the Structure of Management Information (SMI), YANG, WBEM, the Common Information Model (CIM Schema), and MTOSI amongst others.

== Value ==
Effective network management can provide positive strategic impacts. For example, in the case of developing an infrastructure, providing participants with some interactive space allows them to collaborate with each other, thereby promoting overall benefits. At the same time, the value of network management to the strategic network is also affected by the relationship between participants. Active participation, interaction and collaboration can make them more trusting of each other and enhance cohesion.

== See also ==
- Application service management
- Business service management
- Capacity management
- Comparison of network monitoring systems
- FCAPS
- In-network management
- ITIL – Set of practices for Information Technology (IT) development, management and support
- Integrated business planning
- Network and service management taxonomy
- Network monitoring
- Network information system
- Network topology
- Network traffic measurement
- Out-of-band management
- Systems management
- Website monitoring
