= Mittelhauser =

Mittelhauser is a surname. Notable people with the surname include:

- Eugène Mittelhauser (1873–1949), French general
- Jon Mittelhauser (born 1970), American computer programmer
