= FUJITSU Cloud IaaS Trusted Public S5 =

Cloud computing platform

- Release: 1 October 2010; 16 years ago
- Operating system: Linux, Windows Server
- Platform: Xen, Microsoft Azure
- Available in: Japanese (initial launch), English
- Type: Cloud computing
- License: Closed-source software
- Website: welcome.globalcloud.global.fujitsu.com

FUJITSU Cloud IaaS Trusted Public S5 is a Fujitsu cloud computing platform that aims to deliver standardized enterprise-class public cloud services globally. It offers Infrastructure-as-a-Service (IaaS) from Fujitsu's data centres to provide computing resources that can be employed on-demand and suited to customers needs.

In Japan, the service was offered as the On-Demand Virtual System Service (OViSS) and was then launched globally as Fujitsu Global Cloud Platform/S5 (FGCP/S5). Since July 2013 the service has been called IaaS Trusted Public S5. Globally, the service is operated from Fujitsu data centers located in Australia, Singapore, the United States, the United Kingdom and Germany.

Fujitsu has also launched a Windows Global Cloud Platform In partnership with Microsoft. This is a Platform-as-a-Service (PaaS) offering that was known as FGCP/A5 in Japan but has since been renamed FUJITSU Cloud PaaS A5 for Windows Azure. It is operated from a Fujitsu data center in Japan. It offers a set of application development frameworks, such as Microsoft .NET, Java and PHP, and data storage capabilities consistent with the Windows Azure platform provided by Microsoft. The basic service consists of compute, storage, Microsoft SQL Azure, and Windows Azure AppFabric technologies such as Service Bus and Access Control Service, with options for interoperating services covering implementation and migration of applications, system building, systems operation, and support.

In 2015, Fujitsu launched its next generant-generation ice K5 which was deployed globally.

In October 2018, Fujitsu announced that it was discontinuing K5 in all regions except Japan. On October 16, 2018, the company stated that it will hire 10,000 employees and train them to use Microsoft Azure in order to "address what we see as an industry-wide shortage in cloud related skills, so that we can help the clients to address their execution gap in the provision of services which support operational efficiency, digital co-creation and multi-cloud management.”

== History ==
Fujitsu launched its global cloud strategy in April 2010. Provision of services from this platform was offered on a trial basis to 200 companies in Japan from the following month. Fujitsu announced general availability of the IaaS service in Japan, under the name On-Demand Virtual System Service (OViSS), starting on 1 October 2010. As part of the service's global rollout, it was launched in Australia under the name Fujitsu Global Cloud Platform (FGCP) in February 2011. This was followed by launches in March 2011 in Singapore and in May 2011 in the United Kingdom, Germany and the United States of America. In July 2012, Fujitsu added a center in western Japan to bring the total number to seven. In July 2013 Fujitsu announced the FUJITSU Cloud Initiative globally which also announced the new name as FUJITSU Cloud IaaS Trusted Public S5.

In October 2018, Fujitsu announced that it was discontinuing K5 in all regions except Japan.

== Features ==
=== Virtual system ===
The basic component in the IaaS Trusted Public S5 is called a Virtual System. It consists of a firewall and one or multiple network segments in which customers can host their virtual machines. Once signed up, customers can deploy multiple systems within their environment, much like a virtual data center.

=== Templates ===
IaaS Trusted Public S5 employs templates to allow customers to quickly deploy virtual systems. A template consists of a firewall, network segment definitions and virtual servers with OS/middleware installed and set up. This allows quick selection of for example a system of three network zones, with pre-installed a web server in the DMZ, an application server in the secure zone and a database in another secure zone. A virtual system includes a firewall to control access between the network segments and from and to the Internet and intranet. The intranet connection is for communication between the virtual servers and customers' existing servers hosted in the same Fujitsu data center.

=== Virtual servers ===
Virtual servers are chosen from a list of pre-defined images, which have only an operating system installed or also additional software.

Servers with different computational resources are offered.

Server configurations
Plan	Virtual CPU	RAM
Economy	1.0 GHz equivalent (Xeon 2007) x 1	1.7 GB
Standard	2.0 GHz equivalent (Xeon 2007) x 1	3.4 GB
Advanced	4.0 GHz equivalent (Xeon 2007) x 1	7.5 GB
High-Performance	4.0 GHz equivalent (Xeon 2007) x 2	15 GB
Double-High 15	4.0 GHz equivalent (Xeon 2007) x 4	15 GB
Double-High	4.0 GHz equivalent (Xeon 2007) x 4	30 GB
Quad-High 30	4.0 GHz equivalent (Xeon 2007) x 8	30 GB
Quad-High	4.0 GHz equivalent (Xeon 2007) x 8	60 GB

=== Operating systems ===
Operating systems offered globally include Windows Server 2008, Windows Server 2012, Red Hat Enterprise Linux, CentOS and Ubuntu.

=== Microsoft Office ===
Fujitsu has claimed that licensing is the only issue that prevents delivery of Microsoft Office as a cloud service to web based devices, in a manner similar to Google Docs.

=== Storage ===
A virtual server has a system disk of a pre-defined size. Additional disks, with sizes configurable from 10 GB to 10 TB, can be attached to a server when it is not running.

=== Network ===
Customers can provision global IP addresses and assign them to virtual servers. This is similar to Amazon's Elastic IP Address feature.

=== Service portal ===
Users provision and manage their virtual systems through a self-service portal. It can also be used to initiate a VPN connection to a virtual zone.

=== APIs ===
All operations offered through the service portal are also offered through a cloud API. The API is XML-RPC based, using SSL to encrypt its messages and certificates for authentication. Operations are also possible through multi-cloud API Apache Deltacloud.

Fujitsu has submitted their cloud API specification to the Distributed Management Task Force's Open Cloud Standards Incubator to promote open standards for cloud interoperability, and contributed to the DMTF's Cloud Infrastructure Management Interface (CIMI) standard. In July 2013 Fujitsu demonstrated a client using CIMI to manage a system in IaaS Trusted Public S5 at a Management Developers Conference.

== Server locations ==
Servers are physically located in Fujitsu's Tier III data centers in Japan, Australia, Singapore, UK, US and Germany.
