= Management Component Transport Protocol =

Low-level protocol used for controlling hardware components

Management Component Transport Protocol (MCTP) is a protocol designed by the Distributed Management Task Force (DMTF) to support communications between different intelligent hardware components that make up a platform management subsystem, providing monitoring and control functions inside a managed computer system. This protocol is independent of the underlying physical bus properties, as well as the data link layer messaging used on the bus. The MCTP communication model includes a message format, transport description, message exchange patterns, and operational endpoint characteristics.

MCTP allows the transmission of a wide variety of management commands over alternative types of links. Simplified nature of the protocol and reduced encapsulation overheads make MCTP suitable for implementation and processing within system firmware and integrated baseboard management controllers (BMCs), on a wide range of platforms – including servers, workstations and embedded devices. The following table describes which protocols MCTP can encapsulate, and what kind of protocols MCTP can be run over:

MCTP protocol support
Protocol	Can encapsulate	Can transmit over
PCI Express	MI	VDM
NVM Express	Management Messages	No
CXL (Fabric Manager, Type 3 DCCI)	Yes	No
Platform Level Data Model	Yes	No
NC-SI, Ethernet	Yes	No
USB	No	Yes
I2C/SMBus, I3C (incl. PCIe)	No	Yes
Serial Port	No	Yes
ACPI PCC	No	Yes
UCIe	No	Yes
KCS	No	Yes
MMBI (incl. PCIe)	No	Yes

For example, Intel's network interface controllers (NICs) include support for MCTP over PCI Express and SMBus since 2012, allowing these NICs to be controlled and monitored at a low level over MCTP. Exposed configuration and monitoring operations include power management, control of Address Resolution Protocol (ARP) offloading, configuration of the out-of-band management traffic (which can be separated from the Ethernet traffic visible to the operating system by using RMCP ports filtering, a separate MAC address, or through VLAN tagging), and handling of NIC's interrupts and error conditions.

DMTF also defines the Management Controller Host Interface (MCHI), which includes a set of discovery options and registration commands, allowing UEFI, BIOS or the operating system to communicate with a MCTP-enabled BMC. Discovery options include PCI/PCI Express class codes as part of the PCI configuration space, MCHI Description Table and control methods defined and exported via ACPI, and data structures exported via SMBIOS.

== See also ==
- Out-of-band management
- Intelligent Platform Management Interface (IPMI)
- Intel Active Management Technology (AMT)
- NC-SI (Network Controller Sideband Interface)
- Platform Management Components Intercommunication (PMCI)
- Intel Management Engine (ME)
