= Alert Standard Format =

Systems management standard

- Abbreviation: ASF
- Status: Published
- Year started: 2001; 25 years ago
- Latest version: 2.0; April 2003; 23 years ago
- Organization: Distributed Management Task Force
- Related standards: DASH
- Website: www.dmtf.org/standards/asf

Alert Standard Format (ASF) (also sometimes referred to as Alert Standard Forum, Alerting Specifications Forum, Alert Specification Function, etc.) is a DMTF standard for remote monitoring, management and control of computer systems in both OS-present and OS-absent environments. These technologies are primarily focused on minimizing on-site I/T maintenance, maximizing system availability and performance to the local user.

ASF, unlike other DMTF standards, defines both external-facing network protocols (for use with Remote Management Consoles and Alert Sending Devices) and system-internal protocols and data models (for use in System Firmware, Remote Control Devices, Alert Sending Devices, and Sensors).

ASF v1.0 (DSP0114) was published by the DMTF Pre-OS Working Group in June 2001.

ASF v2.0 (DSP0136), adding secure remote authentication and data integrity, was published by the DMTF Pre-OS Working Group in April 2003.

== Network protocols ==
- RMCP (Remote Management and Control Protocol) transmitted by the Remote Management Console and received by the Alert Sending Device via UDP port 623
- RSP (RMCP Security-Extensions Protocol) transmitted by the Remote Management Console and received by the Alert Sending Device via UDP port 664 (added in ASF 2.0)
- PET (Platform Event Traps) transmitted by the Alert Sending Device and received by the Remote Management Console via UDP port 162 (SNMP-Traps)

== Internal protocols and data models ==
- SMBus 2.0 Messages (between the System Firmware, Alert Sending Device, Remote Control Device, and Sensors)
- ACPI System Description Table (sometimes referred to as the "ASF!" table) to be populated by the System Firmware and used by the Alert Sending Device

== See also ==
- Alert on LAN (AoL)
- Desktop and mobile Architecture for System Hardware (DASH)
- Distributed Management Task Force (DMTF)
- Intel Active Management Technology (AMT)
- Intelligent Platform Management Interface (IPMI)
- Wake on LAN (WoL)
