= CIM Schema =

Part of Common Information Model standard

- Status: Published
- Organization: Distributed Management Task Force
- Related standards: WBEM, SMASH, SMI-S
- Website: www.dmtf.org/standards/cim

CIM Schema is a computer specification, part of Common Information Model standard, and created by the Distributed Management Task Force.

It is a conceptual diagram made of classes, attributes, relations between these classes and inheritances, defined in the world of software and hardware. This set of objects and their relations is a conceptual framework for describing computer elements and organizing information about the managed environment.

This schema is the basis of other DMTF standards such as WBEM, SMASH or SMI-S for storage management.

== Extensibility ==
The CIM schema is object-based and extensible, allowing manufacturers to represent their equipment using the elements defined in the core classes of CIM schema. For this, manufacturers provide software extensions called providers, which supplement existing classes by deriving them and adding new attributes.

== Examples of common core classes ==
- CIM_ComputerSystem for a computer host
- CIM_DataFile: Computer file
- CIM_Directory: Files directory
- CIM_DiskPartition: disk partition
- CIM_FIFOPipeFile: Named pipes
- CIM_OperatingSystem: Operating system
- CIM_Process: Computer process
- CIM_SqlTable: Database table
- CIM_SqlTrigger: Database trigger
