= NC-SI =

Electrical interface and protocol

Network Controller Sideband Interface
- Abbreviation: NC-SI
- Status: Published
- Year started: 2010; 16 years ago
- Organization: Distributed Management Task Force (DMTF)
- Base standards: Platform Management Components Intercommunication (PMCI)
- Domain: Out-of-band management
- Website: www.dmtf.org/standards/pmci

NC-SI, abbreviated from network controller sideband interface, is an electrical interface and protocol defined by the Distributed Management Task Force (DMTF). The NC-SI enables the connection of a baseboard management controller (BMC) to one or more network interface controllers (NICs) in a server computer system for the purpose of enabling out-of-band system management. This allows the BMC to use the network connections of the NIC ports for the management traffic, in addition to the regular host traffic.

The NC-SI defines a control communication protocol between the BMC and NICs. The NC-SI is supported over several transports and physical interfaces.

== Hardware interface ==
The RMII-based transport (RBT) interface defined by NC-SI is based on the RMII specification with some modifications that allow connection of multiple network controllers to a single BMC. The NC-SI can also operate over a variety of other electrical interfaces, including SMBus and PCI Express when used over the Management Component Transport Protocol (MCTP).

The table below sums up the signals comprising the RBT interface.

Signal	Description
REF_CLK	50 MHz clock reference for receive, transmit and control interface
CRS_DV	Carrier sense and receive data validity for the traffic sent from one of the NICs
RXD[1:0]	Receive data (from the NIC to the BMC)
TX_EN	Transmit enable and data validity for the traffic sent from the BMC
TXD[1:0]	Transmit data (from the BMC to the NIC)
RX_ER	Receive error signal, sent from the NIC to the BMC (optional)
ARB_IN	Input data hardware arbitration (optional)
ARB_OUT	Output data hardware arbitration (optional)

== Traffic types ==
The NC-SI defines two fundamental types of traffic, pass-through and control traffic. Pass-through traffic consists of data exchanged between the BMC and the network via the NC-SI interface. Control traffic is used to inventory and configure aspects of NIC operation and control the NC-SI interface.

Control traffic is broken down into three sub-types:

- Commands, sent from the BMC to one of the NICs
- Responses, sent by the NICs as results of the commands
- Asynchronous event notifications (AENs), sent asynchronously by the NICs and equivalently to interrupts, upon the occurrence of the specified event

When the NC-SI is used over RBT, standard Ethernet framing is used for all traffic types. Control traffic is identified by using an EtherType of 0x88F8. When the NC-SI is used in conjunction with MCTP, MCTP provides the packetization methodology and traffic type identification.

== See also ==
- Management Component Transport Protocol (MCTP)
- Platform Management Components Intercommunication (PMCI)
