= Deltacloud =

Application programming interface

- Developer: Apache Software Foundation / Red Hat
- Initial release: September 3, 2009; 16 years ago
- Stable release: 1.1.3 / April 17, 2013; 12 years ago
- Written in: Ruby
- Operating system: Linux, Windows
- Type: Library
- License: Apache Software License
- Website: deltacloud.apache.org

Deltacloud is an application programming interface (API) developed by Red Hat and the Apache Software Foundation that abstracts differences between cloud computing implementations. It was created in 2009.

== History ==
Deltacloud was announced on September 3, 2009.

On May 17, 2010 Red Hat contributed Deltacloud to the Apache Incubator project. It graduated Incubator on October 26, 2011 and became Apache Software Foundation TLP (Top-Level Project). In July 2013 Fujitsu and VMware used Deltacloud in a demonstration of CIMI at a Management Developers Conference to manage their cloud infrastructure.

Im May 2013, RedHat announced that it was scaling back its sponsorship of the Apache Deltacloud project, effective immediately.

In July 2015, Deltacloud was moved to the Apache Attic due to inactivity.

== Features ==
Each infrastructure-as-a-service cloud existing today provides its own API. The purpose of Deltacloud is to provide one unified REST-based API that can be used to manage services on any cloud. Each particular cloud is controlled through an adapter called a "driver". As of June 2012, drivers exist for the following cloud platforms: Amazon EC2, Fujitsu Global Cloud Platform, GoGrid, OpenNebula, Rackspace, RHEV-M, RimuHosting, Terremark and VMware vCloud. Next to the 'classic' front-end, it also offers CIMI and EC2 front-ends. Deltacloud is used in applications such as Aeolus to prevent the need to implement cloud-specific logic.

== See also ==
- Aeolus (software)
