= Management Information Format =

Format describing hardware or software component

- Filename extension: .mif
- Internet media type: text/plain

Management Information Format (MIF file) is a format used to describe a hardware or software component. MIF files are used by DMI to report system configuration information. Although MIF is a system-independent format, it is used primarily by Windows systems. To install a new device in a Windows 95 system, the corresponding MIF file is needed.
