= WS-Management =

Systems management standard

Web Services for Management
- Abbreviation: WS-MAN
- Status: Published
- Year started: 2008; 18 years ago
- Latest version: 1.2; September 2014; 11 years ago
- Organization: Distributed Management Task Force
- Related standards: WBEM
- Domain: Systems Management
- Website: www.dmtf.org/standards/wsman

WS-Management (Web Services-Management) is a DMTF open standard defining a SOAP-based protocol for the management of servers, devices, applications and various Web services. WS-Management provides a common way for systems to access and exchange management information across the IT infrastructure.

== Design ==
The specification is based on DMTF open standards and Internet standards for Web services.

The specification is quite rich, supporting much more than get/set of simple variables, and in that it is closer to WBEM or Netconf than to SNMP. A mapping of the DMTF-originated Common Information Model into WS-Management was also defined.

== History ==
WS-Management was originally developed by a coalition of vendors. The coalition started with AMD, Dell, Intel, Microsoft, Sun Microsystems and expanded to a total of 13 members before being subsumed by the DMTF in 2005.

The DMTF published the Web Services for Management (WS-Management) Specification as standards document DSP0226, version 1.2, on September 30, 2014.

== Implementations and application support ==
- Microsoft has implemented the WS-Management standard in Windows Remote Management 1.1 (WinRM), available for Windows XP, Windows Server 2003, Windows Vista and Windows Server 2008.
- Using WS-Management (WinRM 2.0), Windows PowerShell 2.0 allows scripts and cmdlets to be invoked on a remote machine or a large set of remote machines.
- WinRM 2.0 for Windows XP and Windows Server 2003 was released on Oct 26, 2009.
- WinRM 3.0 for Windows 7 and Windows Server 2008 R2 was released on Sept 4 2012 and shipped in Windows 8 and Windows Server 2012.
- A European research project (ITEA 2 programme, a strategic pan-European programme for advanced pre-competitive R&D in Software-intensive Systems and Services), named SODA (Service Oriented Device and Delivery Architecture) developed several implementations of WS-Management in ANSI C, Java, and for OSGi. These implementations are specifically targeted to be used with an open SOAP web service protocol stack named DPWS (Devices Profile for Web Services), and were optimized to be integrated in micro-devices with only 100kB of memory. These implementations are free software, licensed under the GNU Lesser General Public License (LGPL), and their source code is freely available for download.
- Intel Active Management Technology, an out-of-band management suite, uses WS-Management as the out-of-band management protocol.
- OpenNMS, an open-source network management platform, includes a pure-Java WS-Management client library. This library enables WS-Management as a management protocol in OpenNMS.
- By default WinRM HTTP uses port 80 and HTTPS uses port 443. On Windows 7 and higher the default ports are 5985 and 5986, respectively.
