= Merthiolate-Iodine-Formaldehyde =

Merthiolate-Iodine-Formaldehyde (MIF) is a solution used in biomedical laboratories for concentration of stool samples prior to microscopic investigation for parasites. Concentration of stool is necessary in order to raise sensitivity of microscopy, as in non-concentrated samples the likelihood of finding equivalents of actually present parasites is too low. MIF enables separation of different strata of stool matter, and sedimentation of stool particles that contain parasites (usually parasite eggs). After application of MIF, usually centrifugation is used for acceleration of sedimentation.

The term Merthiolate indicates presence of thiomersal in the solution. Due to the hazardous qualities of thiomersal, it is no longer regularly added to MIF-solutions anymore, although the abbreviation MIF is still used for the solution. Thiomersal may nevertheless be added if its preservative qualities are particularly needed, for example if stool samples have to be preserved over longer time periods (for example for teaching samples).

== Content ==
As prepared commercially, 1 liter (0.22 imp gal; 0.26 U.S. gal) of MIF-solution contains:

- Ethanolamine 1,000 mg (15 gr)
- Ethylenediamine 280 mg (4.3 gr)
- Sodium chloride 8,000 mg (120 gr)
- Disodium-Tetraborate-Decahydrate 2,650 mg (40.9 gr)
- Distilled water 1,000 mL (35 imp fl oz; 34 US fl oz)

If Thiomersal is needed for preservation of the sample, add:

- Thiomersal 1,000 mg (15 gr)

== Use ==
For use in laboratory situations, the MIF solution described above is combined with formaldehyde and glycerin in a distilled water dilution.
