= Simple Firmware Interface =

Boot firmware for Intel Moorestown platform

SFI Common Table Format
Offset	Length	Field
0	4	Signature
4	4	Length
8	1	Revision
9	1	Checksum
10	6	OEM ID
16	8	OEM Table ID
24	var.	Table Payload

Simple Firmware Interface (SFI) is developed by Intel Corporation as a lightweight method for firmware to export static tables to the operating system. It is supported by Intel's hand-held Moorestown platform.

SFI tables are data structures in memory, and all SFI tables share a common table header format. The operating system finds the system table by searching 16 byte boundaries between physical address 0x000E0000 and 0x000FFFFF. SFI has CPU, APIC, Memory Map, Idle, Frequency, M-Timer, M-RTC, OEMx, Wake Vector, I²C Device, and a SPI Device table.

SFI provides access to a standard ACPI XSDT (Extended System Description Table). XSDT is used by SFI to prevent namespace collision between SPI and ACPI. It can access standard ACPI tables such as PCI Memory Configuration Table (MCFG).

SFI support was merged into Linux kernel 2.6.32-rc1; the core SFI patch is about 1,000 lines of code. Linux is the first operating system with an SFI implementation. Linux kernel 5.6 marked SFI as obsolete.

SFI support was removed in Linux kernel 5.12.
