= Aleksandar Totic =

- Born: September 23, 1966 (age 60); Belgrade, Serbia
- Education: MSCS at University of Illinois at Urbana Champaign
- Occupations: Software developer, entrepreneur

Aleksandar Totic is one of the original developers of the Mosaic browser. He cofounded and was a partner at Netscape Communications Corporation. He was born in Belgrade, Serbia, on 23 September 1966. He moved to America after his degree from Kuwait was not recognized by the Yugoslav government, and currently lives in Palo Alto, CA San Francisco, CA.
