= CloudBolt =

American software developer of cloud management platform

CloudBolt Software, Inc.
- Industry: Cloud management
- Founded: 2012; 14 years ago
- Founders: Alexandre Augusto "Auggy" da Rocha; Bernard Sanders
- Headquarters: Rockville, MD
- Key people: Jeff Kukowski, CEO; Bernard Sanders, CTO, Co-Founder; Alexandre Augusto "Auggy" da Rocha, Product Architect, Co-Founder; Steven Scribner, CFO; Rick Kilcoyne, VP, Solutions Architecture
- Products: CloudBolt
- Website: cloudbolt.io

CloudBolt is a hybrid cloud management platform developed by CloudBolt Software for deploying and managing virtual machines (VMs), applications, and other IT resources, both in public clouds (e.g., AWS, MS Azure, GCP) and in private data centers (e.g., VMware, OpenStack).

== History ==
The platform was developed by Alexandre Augusto "Auggy" da Rocha and Bernard Sanders. da Rocha began work on a prototype of the platform in 2010, calling it SmartCloud 1.0. Together they created a generalized solution, which was released in August 2011 as SmartCloud 2.0. The early version focused on simple installs and upgrades of virtual machines, and building an extensible product that customers could use as a platform for integrating with other technologies.

In 2012, they renamed their company to CloudBolt Software (to avoid a name conflict with an IBM offering), and in 2013 CloudBolt Command and Control (C2) was included as the cloud manager in Dell Cloud for US Government. In 2014, the product name "CloudBolt Command and Control (C2)" was simplified to "CloudBolt".

Product Timeline:

- 2011 - 2.0 released, with support only for VMware & HP Server Automation (formerly Opsware)
- 2012 - 3.0 released, rebranded as CloudBolt with support for AWS & OpenStack added
- 2013 - 4.0 released, support for Microsoft Azure, Google Cloud Platform, Infoblox, vCO (now vRO), and HP Operations Orchestration, Cobbler
- 2014 - 4.5 released, including integration with Puppet & Chef, ServiceNow
- 2015 - 5.0 released with support for Kubernetes container orchestrator and Razor bare metal provisioning
- 2016 - 6.0 released, with support for Azure ARM, Ansible, Oracle Public Cloud
- 2017 - 7.0 released, with 18 total public clouds and private virtualization systems supported, 4 configuration managers, and 2 external orchestrators
- 2018 - 8.0 released, with everything-as-a-service (XaaS), enhanced containerization and Kubernetes support
- 2019 - 9.0 released, with support for infrastructure-as-code (Terraform), expanded self-service workload delivery, security, and multi-cloud management

=== Funding ===
In July 2018, CloudBolt raised $23M in Series A funding from Insight Venture Partners.

In November 2020, the company received a further $15 million in equity investment from Insight Venture and $20 million in venture debt from Hercules Capital and Bridge Bank, for a total raised to date of $61M.

=== Acquisitions ===
In June 2020, CloutBolt announced the acquisition of Norcross, Georgia based SovLabs, which extends VMware automation capabilities; terms were not announced.

In August 2020, the company announced the acquisition of Melbourne, Australia based Kumolus, a cloud management solution provider; terms were not announced.

In April 2025, CloudBolt announced the acquisition of Arlington, Virginia based StormForge, a cost- and resource-optimization platform for Kubernetes environments; terms were not announced.
