= Service governance =

Means of achieving good corporate governance

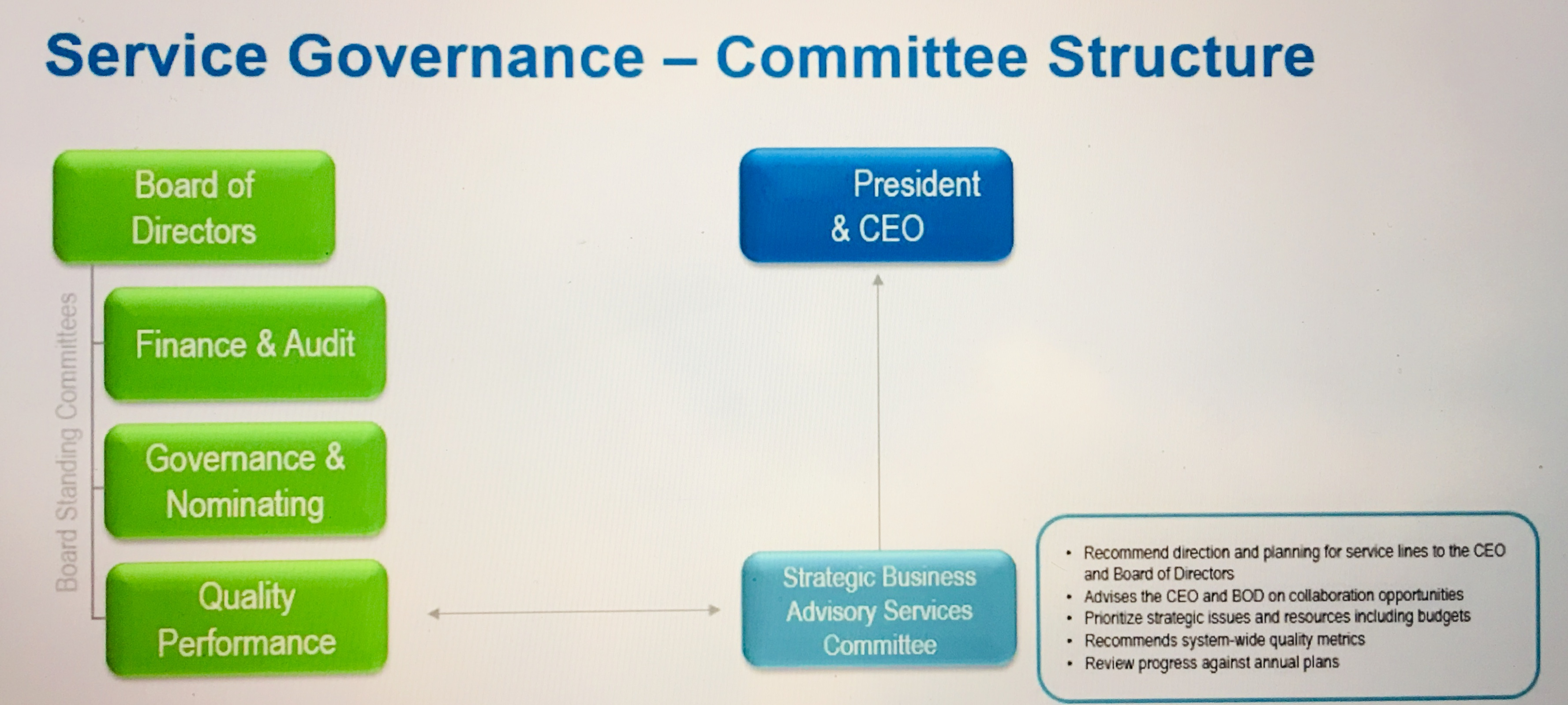
Service governance model

Service governance engages stakeholders and delivery channels for the purpose of effectively managing risk, as well as driving the intended business value with a focus on how decisions are made and enforced in a dynamic business environment.

Though its initial focus was on IT services, this approach to management can apply to accounting and business administration. Principal among the issues is the fair funding for each service and the allocation system for scarce services.

Institutionalizing internal corporate services is the corporate management equivalent of a massive general ledger, only with the line items reflecting the services, not simply departments. The service portfolio allows the governance of services as a means to govern the organization by value.

== History ==
The term service governance has been used to describe the success that a number of organizations have had in using the 'best practice' advice found in frameworks such as ITIL and others, for organization-wide service design and operation.

Many of the ideas of service governance, including the important one of sustainability, are included in ISO 37000, published in September 2021 ISO 37000.

== Service portfolio ==
The portfolio of services is a list of all internal services that are available within the organization. The portfolio describes each service, how it is funded, its associated costs and ownership boundaries, and its current performance and identified conflicts.

The services portfolio provides a map of the organization, providing directors with a different way of understanding the dynamics of the organization than those received from financial reports. This allows the board to more easily make decisions based on accurate and contemporaneous information.

== Value ==
Service governance uses the methods described in the management of value (MoV) to discover the requirements of the organization and to use those on design services, and their measures to deliver those values. In particular, the service governance organization is chartered to define clear service ownership boundaries and specify a fair funding model.

== Measurement and compliance ==
Well-established practices are used to design measures and metrics for the organization and to meet the requirements of the corporate mission, charter, and policy. This ensures that metrics inform what is required by the organization and supply accurate information: to the board for strategic governance decisions and to management for operational decisions.

Accurate metrics also ensure compliance with the requirements of audit, enable the production of financial and sustainability reports, and reports on corporate citizenship.
