= Technical standard =

Established norm or requirement to facilitate consistency

A technical standard is an established norm or requirement for a repeatable technical task which is applied to a common and repeated use of rules, conditions, guidelines or characteristics for products or related processes and production methods, and related management systems practices. A technical standard includes definition of terms; classification of components; delineation of procedures; specification of dimensions, materials, performance, designs, or operations; measurement of quality and quantity in describing materials, processes, products, systems, services, or practices; test methods and sampling procedures; or descriptions of fit and measurements of size or strength.

It is usually a formal document that establishes uniform engineering or technical criteria, methods, processes, and practices. In contrast, a custom, convention, company product, corporate standard, and so forth that becomes generally accepted and dominant is often called a de facto standard.

A technical standard may be developed privately or unilaterally, for example by a corporation, regulatory body, military, etc. Standards can also be developed by groups such as trade unions and trade associations. Standards organizations often have more diverse input and usually develop voluntary standards: these might become mandatory if adopted by a government (i.e., through legislation), business contract, etc.

The standardization process may be by edict or may involve the formal consensus of technical experts.

== Types ==
The primary types of technical standards are:

- A standard specification is an explicit set of requirements for an item, material, component, system or service. It is often used to formalize the technical aspects of a procurement agreement or contract. For example, there may be a specification for a turbine blade for a jet engine that defines the exact material and performance requirements.
- A standard test method describes a definitive procedure that produces a test result. It may involve making a careful personal observation or conducting a highly technical measurement. For example, a physical property of a material is often affected by the precise method of testing: any reference to the property should therefore reference the test method used.
- A standard practice or procedure gives a set of instructions for performing operations or functions. For example, there are detailed standard operating procedures for operation of a nuclear power plant.
- A standard guide is general information or options that do not require a specific course of action.
- A standard definition is formally established terminology.
- Standard units, in physics and applied mathematics, are commonly accepted measurements of physical quantities.

== Definitions ==
Technical standards are defined as:

- Voluntary consensus standards, which are standards developed or adopted by voluntary consensus standards bodies, domestic (national), regional and international.
- Industry standards, also referred to as private standards, which are standards developed in the private sector but not in the full consensus process, typically requiring a financial contribution. UNIDO define private standards as three categories; Consortia standards, Civil society standards and Company-specific standards.
- Government standards, which are standards developed by the government for its own uses.

== Availability ==
Technical standards may exist as:

- Public documents on the internet, public library, etc. (Some technical standards may be found at a major central library or at the library of a good technical university)
- Published documents available for purchase
- Private documents owned by an organization or corporation, used and circulated as the owner determines necessary or useful
- Documents publicly available under intellectual property (copyright, etc.)
- Closed or controlled documents that contain trade secrets or classified information

== Geographic levels ==
When a geographically defined community must solve a community-wide coordination problem, it can adopt an existing standard or produce a new one. The main geographic levels are:

- National standard: by National standards organizations. For example, Telecommunications Industry Association standards.
- Regional standard: see standards of the Regional standards organizations. For example, CEN standards.
- International standard: see International standards organizations Example, ISO and ASTM International.

National/Regional/International standards is one way of overcoming technical barriers in inter-local or inter-regional commerce caused by differences among technical regulations and standards developed independently and separately by each local, local standards organisation, or local company. Technical barriers arise when different groups come together, each with a large user base, doing some well established thing that between them is mutually incompatible. Establishing national/regional/international standards is one way of preventing or overcoming this problem. To further support this, the WTO Technical Barriers to Trade (TBT) Committee published the "Six Principles" guiding members in the development of international standards.

== Usage ==
The existence of a published standard does not imply that it is always useful or correct. For example, if an item complies with a certain standard, there is not necessarily assurance that it is fit for any particular use. The people who use the item or service (engineers, trade unions, etc.) or specify it (building codes, government, industry, etc.) have the responsibility to consider the available standards, specify the correct one, enforce compliance, and use the item correctly. Validation of suitability is necessary.

Standards often get reviewed, revised and updated on a regular basis. It is critical that the most current version of a published standard be used or referenced. The originator or standard writing body often has the current versions listed on its website.

In social sciences, including economics, a standard is useful if it is a solution to a coordination problem: it emerges from situations in which all parties realize mutual gains, but only by making mutually consistent decisions.

Examples:

Parties	Mutual gains	Problem	Solution
Mechanical industry companies	Suppliers interchange, stock gains, etc.	Screw thread compatibility	Screw thread standard specifications
Pharmaceutical industry and medic community	Enable medical prescriptions, suppliers interchange, etc.	Drug uniformity	Drug standard specifications
Banks and specialized payment cards companies	Enable Credit card holder to pay a merchant for goods and services	Credit card uniformity	Credit card Technical specifications ISO 8583

== Private Standards (consortia) ==
Private standards are developed by private entities such as companies, non-governmental organizations or private sector multi-stakeholder initiatives, also referred to as multistakeholder governance. Not all technical standards are created equal. In the development of a technical standard, private standards adopt a non-consensus process in comparison to voluntary consensus standards. This is explained in the paper International standards and private standards.

The International Trade Centre published a literature review series with technical papers on the impacts of private standards and the Food and Agriculture Organization (FAO) published a number of papers in relation to the proliferation of private food safety standards in the agri-food industry, mostly driven by standard harmonization under the multistakeholder governance of the Global Food Safety Initiative (GFSI). With concerns around private standards and technical barriers to trade (TBT), and unable to adhere to the TBT Committee's Six Principles for the development of international standards because private standards are non-consensus, the WTO does not rule out the possibility that the actions of private standard-setting bodies may be subject to WTO law.

BSI Group compared private food safety standards with "plugs and sockets", explaining the food sector is full of "confusion and complexity". Also, "the multiplicity of standards and assurance schemes has created a fragmented and inefficient supply chain structure imposing unnecessary costs on businesses that have no choice but to pass on to consumers". BSI provide examples of other sectors working with a single international standard; ISO 9001 (quality), ISO 14001 (environment), ISO 45001 (occupational health and safety), ISO 27001 (information security) and ISO 22301 (business continuity). Another example of a sector working with a single international standard is ISO 13485 (medical devices), which is adopted by the International Medical Device Regulators Forum (IMDRF).

In 2020, Fairtrade International, and in 2021, Programme for the Endorsement of Forest Certification (PEFC) issued position statements defending their use of private standards in response to reports from The Institute for Multi-Stakeholder Initiative Integrity (MSI Integrity) and Greenpeace.

Private standards typically require a financial contribution in terms of an annual fee from the organizations who adopt the standard. Corporations are encouraged to join the board of governance of the standard owner which enables reciprocity. Meaning corporations have permission to exert influence over the requirements in the standard, and in return the same corporations promote the standards in their supply chains which generates revenue and profit for the standard owner. Financial incentives with private standards can result in a perverse incentive, where some private standards are created solely with the intent of generating money. BRCGS, as scheme owner of private standards, was acquired in 2016 by LGC Ltd who were owned by private equity company Kohlberg Kravis Roberts. This acquisition triggered substantial increases in BRCGS annual fees. In 2019, LGC Ltd was sold to private equity companies Cinven and Astorg.

== See also ==
- De facto standard – Convention that is widely accepted but unofficial
- Harmonization (standards)
- International Organization for Standardization – International standards development organization
- International Standard – Standard developed by international standards organizations
- List of computer standards
- List of international common standards
- List of technical standard organisations
- Software standard
- Specification (technical standard) – Documented requirements to be satisfied by a material, design, product, or service
- Standard (metrology) – Defined standard of a physical quantity
- Standardization – Implementation of technical standards based on the consensus of different parties
- Standards organization – Organization that develops standards
- World Standards Cooperation – Alliance of stardardization organizations
- World Standards Day – International day on 14 October
