= Independent hardware vendor =

Company specializing in making or selling computer hardware, usually for niche markets

An independent hardware vendor (IHV) is a company that designs, manufactures, or sells hardware or peripherals compatible with operating systems. Examples of independent hardware vendors are Intel, AMD, and Samsung.

== See also ==
- Independent software vendor
