= Storage Networking Industry Association =

Trade association formed to develop standards for storage area networks

- Abbreviation: SNIA
- Formation: December 22, 1997; 28 years ago
- Type: Nonprofit
- Headquarters: 5201 Great America Parkway, Suite 320
- Location: Santa Clara, California, U.S.
- Chair: J Michel Metz (AMD)
- Vice Chair: Richelle Ahlvers (Intel)
- Chief Operations Officer: Michael Meleedy
- Website: snia.org

The Storage Networking Industry Association (SNIA) is an American trade association, incorporated in December 1997. It is a registered 501(c)(6) non-profit organization. SNIA has more than 185 unique members, 2,000 active contributing members, and over 50,000 IT end users and storage professionals.

== Description ==
SNIA's membership community participates in the following storage-related technical working groups:

- Cloud Storage Technologies
- Computational Storage
- Data Management
- Data Security
- Dictionary
- DNA Data Storage
- Networked Storage
- Next Generation Data Center
- Persistent Memory
- Physical Storage
- Power Efficiency Measurement
- Storage Management Initiative – Specification (SMI-S)
- SNIA Swordfish® - Scalable Storage Management Specification

SNIA Technical Council and Technical Work

The SNIA Technical Council is a group of high-tech industry representatives that guides the organization's technical activities. The council oversees SNIA's Technical Work Groups (TWGs) and serves as the organization's technical liaison to standards organizations.

SNIA's Technical Work Groups develop vendor-neutral architectures, standards, specifications, and supporting software in areas including AI data workloads, cloud object storage, computational storage, security, solid-state storage, storage management, and DNA data storage.

The SNIA dictionary won an award for publication excellence in 2009 and 2012 from the Business Communications Report.

SNIA organizes the annual SNIA Developer Conference (SDC), originally known as the Storage Developer Conference. The conference was launched in 2004 and is a technical event focused on data infrastructure technologies, including storage, artificial intelligence, memory, networking, compute, security, and data management. It also features interoperability testing through SNIA Plugfests and Birds-of-a-Feather (BoF) sessions. The conference has typically been held in Santa Clara, California. SNIA also organizes one-day regional SDC conferences.

SNIA absorbed the Small Form Factor Committee in 2016.

SNIA also maintains partnerships with and submits material to other industry standards organizations such as ISO, IEC, DMTF, CXL, INCITS T10, T11, IETF, and IEEE.

== SNIA Educational Library ==
The SNIA Educational Library is a collection of technical resources published by SNIA, including specifications and standards, conference presentations, videos, webinars, and technical white papers. It contains more than 4,400 resources on storage, data management, networking, AI infrastructure, and related technologies.

== Small Form Factor Committee ==
The Small Form Factor Committee (SFF) was an ad hoc electronics industry group formed to quickly develop interoperability specifications (as a complement to the traditional standards process). They created the Small Form-factor Pluggable network interface module format. The committee was absorbed by the Storage Networking Industry Association in 2016.

The SFF Committee was formed in 1990 to define the emerging disk drive form factor for laptop computers. In November 1992, the members broadened the objectives to complement the formal standards process in any area of the storage industry which needed prompt attention. SFF projects are in areas not addressed by standards committees because of timing, charter, or other considerations.

The committee consisted of members that represent companies that develop, manufacture, and sell products and components for the storage industry. Its members included but were not limited to representatives from companies such as Amphenol Interconnect, Avago Technologies, Broadcom, Dell, FCI Electronics, Foxconn, Fujitsu Components America, Hewlett Packard, Hitachi, IBM, Intel, LSI Corporation, Molex, Panduit, Pioneer Corporation, Samsung, Seagate Technology, Sumitomo Electric Industries, Sun Microsystems, Texas Instruments, Toshiba, Tyco Electronics, and W. L. Gore & Associates.
