= Systems management =

Enterprise-wide administration of distributed systems including computer systems

Systems management is enterprise-wide administration of distributed systems including (and commonly in practice) computer systems. Systems management is strongly influenced by network management initiatives in telecommunications. The application performance management (APM) technologies are now a subset of Systems management. Maximum productivity can be achieved more efficiently through event correlation, system automation and predictive analysis which is now all part of APM.

== Discussion ==
Centralized management has a time and effort trade-off that is related to the size of the company, the expertise of the IT staff, and the amount of technology being used:

- For a small business startup with ten computers, automated centralized processes may take more time to learn how to use and implement than just doing the management work manually on each computer.
- A very large business with thousands of similar employee computers may clearly be able to save time and money, by having IT staff learn to do systems management automation.
- A small branch office of a large corporation may have access to a central IT staff, with the experience to set up automated management of the systems in the branch office, without need for local staff in the branch office to do the work.

Systems management may involve one or more of the following tasks:

- Hardware inventories.
- Server availability monitoring and metrics.
- Software inventory and installation.
- Anti-virus and anti-malware.
- User's activities monitoring.
- Capacity monitoring.
- Security management.
- Storage management.
- Network capacity and utilization monitoring.
- Identity Access Management
- Anti-manipulation management

== Functions ==
Functional groups are provided according to International Telecommunication Union Telecommunication Standardization Sector (ITU-T) Common management information protocol (X.700) standard. This framework is also known as Fault, Configuration, Accounting, Performance, Security (FCAPS).

Fault management
- Troubleshooting, error logging and data recovery
Configuration management
Hardware and software inventory

- As we begin the process of automating the management of our technology, what equipment and resources do we have already?
- How can this inventorying information be gathered and updated automatically, without direct hands-on examination of each device, and without hand-documenting with a pen and notepad?
- What do we need to upgrade or repair?
- What can we consolidate to reduce complexity or reduce energy use?
- What resources would be better reused somewhere else?
- What commercial software are we using that is improperly licensed, and either needs to be removed or more licenses purchased?

- Provisioning

- What software will we need to use in the future?
- What training will need to be provided to use the software effectively?

- Software deployment

- What steps are necessary to install it on perhaps hundreds or thousands of computers?

- Package management

- How do we maintain and update the software we are using, possibly through automated update mechanisms?

Accounting management
- Billing and statistics gathering
Performance management
- Software metering
- Who is using the software and how often?

- If the license says only so many copies may be in use at any one time but may be installed in many more places than licensed, then track usage of those licenses.
- If the licensed user limit is reached, either prevent more people from using it, or allow overflow and notify accounting that more licenses need to be purchased.

- Event and metric monitoring

- How reliable are the computers and software?
- What errors or software bugs are preventing staff from doing their job?
- What trends are we seeing for hardware failure and life expectancy?

Security management
- Identity management
- Policy management

However this standard should not be treated as comprehensive, there are obvious omissions. Some are recently emerging sectors, some are implied and some are just not listed. The primary ones are:

- Business Impact functions (also known as Business Systems Management)
- Capacity management
- Real-time Application Relationship Discovery (which supports Configuration Management)
- Security Information and Event Management functions (SIEM)
- Workload scheduling

Performance management functions can also be split into end-to-end performance measuring and infrastructure component measuring functions. Another recently emerging sector is operational intelligence (OI) which focuses on real-time monitoring of business events that relate to business processes, not unlike business activity monitoring (BAM).

== Standards ==
Distributed Management Task Force (DMTF)
Alert Standard Format (ASF)
Common Information Model (CIM)
Desktop and mobile Architecture for System Hardware (DASH)
Systems Management Architecture for Server Hardware (SMASH)
Java Management Extensions (JMX)

== Academic preparation ==
Schools that offer or have offered degrees in the field of systems management include the University of Southern California, the University of Denver, Capitol Technology University, and Florida Institute of Technology.

== See also ==
- List of systems management systems
- Application service management
- Enterprise service management
- Business transaction management
- Computer Measurement Group
- Event correlation
- Network management
- Operational intelligence
- System administration
- Service governance

== Bibliography ==
- Hegering, Heinz-Gerd; Abeck, Sebastian; Neumair, Bernhard (1999). Integriertes Management vernetzter Systeme : Konzepte, Architekturen und deren betrieblicher Einsatz. Heidelberg: dpunkt-Verl. ISBN 3-932588-16-9.
