= Storage Management Initiative – Specification =

Storage Management Initiative Specification
- Abbreviation: SMI-S
- Status: Published
- Year started: 2002; 24 years ago
- Latest version: 1.8.0 rev 5 March 2020; 6 years ago
- Organization: Storage Networking Industry Association
- Base standards: CIM, WBEM
- Domain: Computer storage
- Website: www.snia.org/smis

The Storage Management Initiative Specification, commonly called SMI-S, is a computer data storage management standard developed and maintained by the Storage Networking Industry Association (SNIA). It has also been ratified as an ISO standard. SMI-S is based upon the Common Information Model and the Web-Based Enterprise Management standards defined by the Distributed Management Task Force, which define management functionality via HTTP. The most recent approved version of SMI-S is available on the SNIA website.

The main objective of SMI-S is to enable broad interoperable management of heterogeneous storage vendor systems. The current version is SMI-S 1.8.0 Rev 5. Over 1,350 storage products are certified as conformant to SMI-S.

== Basic concepts ==
SMI-S defines CIM management profiles for storage systems. The entire SMI Specification is categorized in profiles and subprofiles. A profile describes the behavioral aspects of an autonomous, self-contained management domain. SMI-S includes profiles for Arrays, Switches, Storage Virtualizers, Volume Management and several other management domains. In DMTF parlance, an SMI-S provider is an implementation for a specific profile or set of profiles. A subprofile describes a part of a management domain, and can be a common part in more than one profile.

At a very basic level, SMI-S entities are divided into two categories:

- Clients are management software applications that can reside virtually anywhere within a network, provided they have a communications link (either within the data path or outside the data path) to providers.
- Servers are the devices under management. Servers can be disk arrays, virtualization engines, host bus adapters, switches, tape drives, etc.

== SMI-S timeline ==
- 2000 – Collection of computer storage industry leaders led by Roger Reich begins building an interoperable management backbone for storage and storage networks (named Bluefin) in a small consortia called the Partner Development Process.
- 2002 – Bluefin donated by the consortia to the Storage Networking Industry Association (SNIA) and later renamed to Storage Management Initiative – Specification or SMI-S. SMI-S 1.0 publicly announced by the SNIA.
- 2003 – The Storage Management Initiative launches formal industry wide specification development, interoperability testing and demonstrations programs, as well as conformance testing systems and certifications. Work proceeds in the SNIA SMI Technical Steering Committee and related TWGs.
- 2004 – SMI-S 1.0.2 becomes an ANSI standard. Initial development of SMI-S 1.1.0 started.
- 2005 – SMI-S 1.0.2 submitted to ISO.
- 2006 – SMI-S 1.0.3 accepted as an ISO standard. SMI-S 1.1.0 published as a SNIA Technical Position. Working Drafts developed for SMI-S 1.2.0.
- 2007 – SMI-S 1.2.0 published as a SNIA Technical Position. Working Drafts developed for SMI-S 1.3.0 and SMI-S 1.4.0.
- 2008 – SMI-S 1.1.1 published as an ANSI standard and submitted to ISO for consideration as an ISO standard. SMI-S 1.3.0 published as a SNIA Technical Position.
- 2009 – SMI-S 1.4.0 published as a SNIA Technical Position. Working Drafts developed for SMI-S 1.5.0.
- 2010 – SMI-S 1.5.0 published as a SNIA Technical Position. Working Drafts developed for SMI-S 1.6.0.
- 2011 – SMI-S 1.1.1 published as an ISO standard, ISO/IEC 24775:2011. SMI-S 1.3.0 published as an ANSI standard: INCITS 388-2011. Development continues on SMI-S 1.6.0 and 1.6.1 in SNIA Technical Work Groups. Discussions are being conducted re a possible SMI-S V2.0.
- 2012 – SMI-S 1.6.0 published as a SNIA Technical Position. Five interoperability plugfests held.
- 2013 – Working Drafts developed for SMI-S 1.6.1. Five interoperability plugfests held, include one international plugfest (US and China).
- 2014 – Eight books that comprise SMI-S 1.5.0 published as an ISO standard: Information technology -- Storage management. SNIA SMI-S 1.6.1 Rev 5 published as a SNIA Technical Position. Working Drafts developed for SMI-S 1.7.0 Rev 1. Six interoperability plugfests held, including two international plugfests (US and China).
- 2015 – Working Drafts developed for SMI-S 1.7.0. Six interoperability plugfests held, including one in China.
- 2016 – SMI-S 1.7.0 Rev 5 is published as a SNIA Technical Position. Multiple interoperability plugfests held.
- 2018 – SMI-S 1.8.0 Rev 3 is published as a SNIA Technical Position. Multiple interoperability plugfests held.
- 2019 – SMI-S 1.8.0 Rev 4 is published as a SNIA Technical Position. Multiple interoperability plugfests held.
- 2020 – SMI-S 1.8.0 Rev 5 is published as a SNIA Technical Position. Multiple interoperability plugfests held.

== Open source projects ==
- pywbem - An open source library written in Python. It provides storage management software developers and system administrators with an easy-to-use method of accessing Common Information Model (CIM) objects and operations in Web-Based Enterprise Management (WBEM) servers, such as those found in SMI-S and other CIM-based environments.
- pywbem GitHub Library - A repository of pywbem projects on GitHub.
- pywbem Documentation - An overview of pywbem projects, community issues and feature requests.
- StorageIM SMI-S monitor client for SMI-enabled Arrays, Switches, HBAs and Storage Libraries.
- SBLIM Umbrella project for a collection of systems management tools to enable WBEM on Linux.

== See also ==
- CIM — Common Information Model
- WBEM — Web-Based Enterprise Management
- SNIA — Storage Networking Industry Association
- SCVMM System Center 2012 - Virtual Machine Manager
- Storage Management Initiative Specification (SMI-S) – SNIA SMI-S website
