= Distributed Management Task Force =

Industry standards organisation

DMTF
- Abbreviation: DMTF
- Formation: 1992
- Type: Standards Development Organization
- Purpose: Developing management standards and promoting interoperability for enterprise and Internet environments
- Members: Broadcom Inc., Cisco, Dell Technologies, Hewlett Packard Enterprise, Intel Corporation, Lenovo, Positivo Tecnologia S.A., and Verizon.
- Website: www.dmtf.org

Distributed Management Task Force (DMTF) is a 501(c)(6) nonprofit industry standards organization that creates open manageability standards spanning diverse emerging and traditional IT infrastructures including cloud, virtualization, network, servers and storage. Member companies and alliance partners collaborate on standards to improve interoperable management of information technologies.

Based in Portland, Oregon, the DMTF is led by a board of directors representing technology companies including: Broadcom Inc., Cisco, Dell Technologies, Hewlett Packard Enterprise, Intel Corporation, Lenovo, Positivo Tecnologia S.A., and Verizon.

== History ==
Founded in 1992 as the Desktop Management Task Force, the organization's first standard was the now-legacy Desktop Management Interface (DMI). As the organization evolved to address distributed management through additional standards, such as the Common Information Model (CIM), it changed its name to the Distributed Management Task Force in 1999, but is now known as, DMTF.

The DMTF continues to address converged, hybrid IT and the Software Defined Data Center (SDDC) with its latest specifications, such as the Redfish standard, SMBIOS, SPDM, and PMCI standards.

== Standards ==
DMTF standards include:

- CADF - Cloud Auditing Data Federation
- CIMI - Cloud Infrastructure Management Interface
- CIM - Common Information Model
- CMDBf - Configuration Management Database Federation
- DASH - Desktop and mobile Architecture for System Hardware
- MCTP - Management Component Transport Protocol Including NVMe-MI, I2C/SMBus and PCIe Bindings
- NC-SI - Network Controller Sideband Interface
- OVF - Open Virtualization Format
- PLDM - Platform Level Data Model Including Firmware Update, Redfish Device Enablement (RDE)
- Redfish – Including Protocols, Schema, Host Interface, Profiles
- SMASH - Systems Management Architecture for Server Hardware
- System Management BIOS (SMBIOS) – Standardized Host Management Information
- SPDM - Security Protocol and Data Model
