= MIMIC Simulator =

MIMIC Simulator Suite
- Developer: Gambit Communications, Inc.
- Written in: C++, Java, Python, Perl, Tcl, PHP, Javascript
- OS family: SNMP simulators
- Working state: Current
- Source model: Closed source
- Latest release: 18.00 / May 15, 2018 version 18.00
- Marketing target: network management and IoT
- Available in: C++, Java, Python, Perl, Tcl, PHP, Javascript
- Platforms: Linux, Microsoft Windows
- License: Proprietary
- Official website: MIMIC Simulator Suite

MIMIC Simulator is a product suite from Gambit Communications consisting of simulation software in the network and systems management space.

The MIMIC Simulator Suite has several components related to simulation of managed networks and data centers for the purposes of software development, software testing or training, sales and marketing of network management applications (see).

MIMIC SNMP simulator solves a classical simulation problem: network management or operations support system software typically manages large networks. Traditionally, in order to set up such networks for the above purposes, physical equipment had to be separately purchased and assembled in laboratories. To reduce the expense, most of the network can be simulated (e.g. see).

The principle behind SNMP simulation is that the SNMP protocol is an interface that can be simulated. SNMP requests carry data values for MIB objects, which can be shaped at will by the simulator, thus representing any device which has an SNMP interface. In contrast to network simulation, where the entire network is modeled within a computer, this type of empirical simulation is visible on the network, and one can communicate with the simulator over the network.

The concept can be extended to other protocols such as for

- cable modems,
- CLI such as Cisco IOS (see) or TL1,
- flow-based monitoring such as NetFlow or sFlow,
- server management based on IPMI or DMTF Redfish,
- IoT protocols such as MQTT, CoAP.

Modern management software typically uses multiple protocols to manage networks. The simulator thus should integrate the required protocols to present authentic instrumentation.

== Components ==
MIMIC IOS Simulator allows simulating the CLI protocol as encountered with Cisco IOS, JUNOS, TL/1. The low-end MIMIC Virtual Lab products can be used for training for Cisco CCNA.

MIMIC NetFlow Simulator creates many custom NetFlow exporters, MIMIC sFlow Simulator does the same for sFlow.

MIMIC IPMI Simulator simulates the IPMI RMCP via LAN interface for high-end servers.

MIMIC Web Simulator handles HTTP / SOAP / XML / WSDL / WSMAN / Redfish interfaces for management via Web services.

MIMIC IoT Simulator creates large IoT environments based on standard protocols MQTT, CoAP.

== Sources ==
- Virtual router labs
- Gambit simulates the network with virtual software
- Advanced HP Network Node Manager Software
- 12th Annual Well-Connected Awards: Network Infrastructure
