= Telecommunication Management Network model =

Network management framework

The Telecommunication Management Network (TMN) model comprises the following four layers:

- Business management layer: performs functions related to business aspects, analyzes trends and quality issues, for example, or to provide a basis for billing and other financial reports.
- Service management layer: performs functions for the handling of services in the network: definition, administration and charging of services
- Network management layer: performs functions for distribution of network resources: configuration, control and supervision of the network
- Element management layer: contains functions for the handling of individual network elements. This includes alarm management, handling of information, [backup], logging, and maintenance of hardware

== See also ==
- FCAPS
- Element Management System
- Network management system
