= Element management =

Element management is concerned with managing network elements on the element management layer (EML) of the TMN (Telecommunications Management Network). An element management system (EMS) manages one or more of a specific type of telecommunications network elements (NE).

It manages functions and capabilities within each NE but does not manage the traffic between different NEs in the network.

It also provides foundation to implement TMN – layered operations support systems (OSS) architectures for better operability and meeting stringent QoS requirements.

OSS Interoperability between EMS and NMS has reached great heights with the introduction of CORBA (Common Object Request Broker Architecture).

== For server appliances ==
A server appliance is a computing entity that delivers predefined services through an application-specific interface with no accessible operating software. In order to develop a true server appliance, the end-user must be shielded from managing the solution as a general purpose server.

An element manager routinely audits the operational condition of core elements, including CPUs, power supplies and disk drives. In the event of hardware or software malfunctions, crashes, runtime errors and system boot failure, the element manager phones home and automatically generates a maintenance request. The use of standards-based mechanisms such as SNMP and Syslog ensures full integration with today's network management systems and provides a unified view of system-wide functionality. The element manager uniquely manages the software as an image and not just a collection of software parts.

An element manager also includes update services that automate the process and management of delivering updates, patches and other upgrades to server appliances deployed in field, including the operating system and all related applications. The update service provides a secure phone home point for delivering encrypted manifests and patches in the field.

== State models for network elements (NEs) ==
A network element state model facilitates cross domain network management and promotes a multi-vendor environment. The standard definitions and mappings allow operations systems to gather state information from NEs and integrate it into a consistent representation of the status of the entire managed network and each of the services that it supports.

Telcordia GR-1093 discusses the two primary state models in industry. One is the Telcordia State Model, which consolidates the state models previously described in several Telcordia documents. By consolidating the models, changes and expansions to the models can be presented and can evolve in a coordinated fashion. Also, inconsistencies and redundancy may be averted. The other model is the International Organization for Standardization (ISO) State Model, which is defined in International Telecommunication Union - Telecommunication (ITU-T) Rec. X.731.

The state of an entity represents the current condition of availability of the underlying resource or service in the NE from the point of view of management. In the context of the Telcordia State Model, the term "entity" represents an entry in a TL1 administrative view (i.e., represents the resource or service generally identified by the Access Identifier [AID] parameter). In the context of the ISO State Model, the term "entity" means "managed object".

Different types of entities (such as hardware, transport facilities, and subscriber service) have a variety of state characteristics that express the availability of their underlying resources that are specific to each entity type. However, a state model is expected to be common to a large number of types of entities. It expresses key aspects of their availability at any given time. The purpose of the state model is to indicate the availability of an entity in providing its functions and, if an entity is not available, to indicate the cause of the unavailability and what kind of activity may be taken by the manager (e.g., the OS or the craft) to make the entity available.

In a specific application, only a subset of the state model may be needed. The rationale of such restrictions is not described in GR-1093. The technology or application-specific requirements document should be consulted for this information.

The standard definitions and mappings allow operations systems to gather state information from NEs and integrate it into a consistent representation of the status of the entire managed network and each of the services that it supports.

To help ensure interoperability, particularly for an OS that interfaces with multiple NEs using one of the two state models, a mapping between the models may be needed. GR-1093 provides a mapping for the two models and also defines the extension to the OSI state/status attributes that is necessary to meet the telecommunications needs of the service providers.
