= CMIP =

CMIP can refer to:

- Common Management Information Protocol, the OSI specified network management protocol
- Coupled Model Intercomparison Project, a collaborative framework designed to improve knowledge of climate change and global warming
- Institute for Monitoring Peace and Cultural Tolerance in School Education (formerly Center for Monitoring the Impact of Peace), a non-profit organization that monitors the content of school textbooks
