= NMA =

NMA may refer to:

- National Management Association, American association for teaching leadership in business management
- National mapping agency, organisation that produces topographic maps and geographic information of a country
- National Meat Association, a meat processors trade group, now part of the North American Meat Institute
- National Medical Association, professional group for African-American physicians
- National Mining Association, American trade organization for the mining industry
- National Motorists Association, an American activist organization opposed to excessive traffic laws and enforcement
- National Movie Awards, annual British film awards from 2007 to 2011
- National Museum of Australia, museum in Acton, NCT, Australia
- Nederlandse Mededingingsautoriteit (Netherlands Competition Authority), former Dutch regulatory agency
- Nepal Medical Association, medical doctor's association in Nepal
- Nepal Mountaineering Association, the national mountaineering association of Nepal
- Network management application, a program for management of a computer network
- Neue Mozart-Ausgabe, second complete edition of the works of Mozart
- New Media Age, British new media magazine
- New Midsize Airplane, a Boeing project to develop a new airliner for delivery in the 2020s.
- New Model Army (band), English rock band
- News Media Alliance, a trade group for the news industry in the US and Canada
- Next Media Animation, former name of Next Animation Studio, Taiwanese company producing animated political satire
- Nigerian Medical Association, professional group for Nigerian doctors and dentists
- Nollywood Movies Awards, annual film awards in Nigeria (since 2016, Nolly Awards)
- Norwegian Maritime Authority, The Norwegian Maritime Authority is a government agency responsible for life, health, working conditions and the environment for Norwegian registered ships.
- Namangan Airport IATA code
- Northern Marianas Athletics organization of athletics in the Northern Mariana Islands
