= The Imitation Game (disambiguation) =

The Imitation Game is a 2014 film based on a biography of Alan Turing.

The Imitation Game may also refer to:

- Imitation game or Turing test: a test, devised by Alan Turing, of a machine's ability to exhibit intelligent behaviour.
- The Imitation Game (soundtrack), score album to the 2014 film
- The Imitation Game (play), 1980 British television play
- The Imitation Game (TV series), 2018 British television game show

== See also ==
- Imitation (disambiguation)
