= Common Management Information Protocol =

Computer network management protocol

The Common Management Information Protocol (CMIP) is the OSI specified network management protocol.

Defined in ITU-T Recommendation X.711, ISO/IEC International Standard 9596-1. It provides an implementation for the services defined by the Common Management Information Service (CMIS) specified in ITU-T Recommendation X.710, ISO/IEC International Standard 9595, allowing communication between network management applications and management agents. CMIS/CMIP is the network management protocol specified by the ISO/OSI Network management model and is further defined by the ITU-T in the X.700 series of recommendations.

CMIP models management information in terms of managed objects and allows both modification and performing actions on managed objects. Managed objects are described using GDMO (Guidelines for the Definition of Managed Objects), and can be identified by a distinguished name (DN), from the X.500 directory.

CMIP also provides good security (support authorization, access control, and security logs) and flexible reporting of unusual network conditions.

== Services implemented ==
The management functionality implemented by CMIP is described under CMIS services.

In a typical Telecommunications Management Network, a management system will make use of the management operation services to monitor network elements. Management agents found on network elements will make use of the management notification services to send notifications or alarms to the network management system.

== Deployment ==
CMIP is implemented in association with the ACSE and ROSE protocols. Both are Layer 7 OSI protocols (Application Layer). ACSE is used to manage associations between management applications (i.e. manage connections between CMIP agents). ROSE is employed for all data exchange interactions. Besides the presence of these Layer 7 protocols, CMIP assumes the presence of all OSI layers at lower levels but does not explicitly specify what these should be.

There have been some attempts to adapt CMIP to the TCP/IP protocol stack. Most notable is CMOT contained in RFC 1189 (detailing CMIP over TCP). Other possibilities include RFC 1006 (which provides an ISO transport service on top of TCP), and CMIP over LPP (a presentation layer protocol that can run on top of TCP or UDP).

There is also a form of CMIS that is developed to operate directly on top of the LLC sublayer. It is called the LAN/MAN Management Protocol (LMMP), formerly it was the Common Management Information Services and Protocol over IEEE 802 Logical Link Control (CMOL). This protocol does away with the need for the OSI stack as is the case with CMIP.

== History ==
CMIP was designed in competition with SNMP, and has far more features than SNMP. For example, SNMP defines only "set" actions to alter the state of the managed device, while CMIP allows the definition of any type of action. CMIP was a key part of the Telecommunications Management Network, and enabled cross-organizational as well as cross-vendor network management. On the Internet, however, most TCP/IP devices support SNMP and not CMIP. This is because of the complexity and resource requirements of CMIP agents and management systems. CMIP is supported mainly by telecommunication devices.

== See also ==
- Common Management Information Service (CMIS)
- CMIP over TCP/IP (CMOT)
