= Common Management Information Service =

The Common Management Information Service (CMIS) is the service interface specified in ITU-T Recommendation X.710, ISO/IEC International Standard 9595 that is employed by OSI network elements for network management. It defines the service interface that is implemented by the Common Management Information Protocol (CMIP) as specified in ITU-T Recommendation X.711, ISO/IEC International Standard 9596-1. CMIS is part of the Open Systems Interconnection (OSI) body of international network standards.

Note the term CMIP is sometimes used erroneously when CMIS is intended. CMIS/CMIP is most often used in telecommunications applications, in other areas SNMP has become more popular.

== Services ==
The following services are made available by the Common Management Information Service Element (CMISE) to allow management of network elements:

=== Management operation services ===
- M-CREATE – Create an instance of a managed object
- M-DELETE – Delete an instance of a managed object
- M-GET – Request managed object attributes (for one object or a set of objects)
- M-CANCEL-GET – Cancel an outstanding GET request
- M-SET – Set managed object attributes
- M-ACTION – Request an action to be performed on a managed object

=== Management notification services ===
- M-EVENT-REPORT – Send events occurring on managed objects

=== Management association services ===
To transfer management information between open systems using CMIS/CMIP, peer connections, i.e., associations, must be established. This requires the establishment of an Application layer association, a Session layer connection, a Transport layer connection, and, depending on supporting communications technology, Network layer and Link layer connections.

CMIS initially defined management association services but it was later decided these services could be provided by ACSE and these services were removed. Below is a list of these services which were subsequently removed from ISO 9595:

- M-INITIALIZE – Creates an association with (i.e. connects to) another CMISE
- M-TERMINATE – Terminates an established connection
- M-ABORT – Terminates the association in the case of an abnormal connection termination

== See also ==
- Common Management Information Protocol (CMIP)
