= Godzilla (2014 soundtrack) =

Godzilla (Original Motion Picture Soundtrack)

Film score by Alexandre Desplat
- Released: May 13, 2014
- Genre: Film score
- Length: 60:27
- Label: WaterTower Music
- Producers: Peter Afterman (exec.), Paul Broucek (exec.), Gareth Edwards (exec.), Jason Linn (exec.), Dave Jordan (exec.), Dominique Lemonnier

Alexandre Desplat chronology
The Grand Budapest Hotel (2014)	Godzilla (Original Motion Picture Soundtrack) (2014)	The Imitation Game (2014)

Professional ratings
Review scores
Source	Rating
AllMusic	4/5 stars
Movie Wave Net	5/5 stars
Filmtracks	4/5 stars

Godzilla (Original Motion Picture Soundtrack) is the soundtrack album to the 2014 American monster film Godzilla, composed and conducted by Alexandre Desplat and performed by the Hollywood Studio Symphony.

The film score was released digitally by WaterTower Music on May 13, 2014, and a separate vinyl album was launched on June 17.

== Development ==
Desplat had not composed previously for a monster film, having worked on movies such as The Curious Case of Benjamin Button (2008), The King's Speech (2010) and the final two Harry Potter films. He accepted the contract after being impressed with Edwards' film Monsters. He further describes the soundtrack for Godzilla as "non-stop fortissimo, with lots of brass, Japanese drums, and electric violin." Desplat described that "discovering and sustaining an emotional center against a backdrop of burning buildings, dazzling explosions and monsters" as one of his biggest challenges and to sustain this, he kept the score "organic" utilizing the various colors of an orchestra to match the nuances of the film’s ensemble cast and "emphasize these characters’ broken souls".

== Track listing ==
All music is composed by Alexandre Desplat.

Godzilla (Original Motion Picture Soundtrack)
No.	Title	Length
1.	"Godzilla!"	2:09
2.	"Inside The Mines"	2:25
3.	"The Power Plant"	5:49
4.	"To Q Zone"	2:56
5.	"Back to Janjira"	6:00
6.	"Muto Hatch"	3:14
7.	"In The Jungle"	2:00
8.	"The Wave"	3:04
9.	"Airport Attack"	1:48
10.	"Missing Spore"	3:58
11.	"Vegas Aftermath"	3:23
12.	"Ford Rescued"	1:23
13.	"Following Godzilla"	2:02
14.	"Golden Gate Chaos"	2:51
15.	"Let Them Fight"	1:39
16.	"Entering The Nest"	3:01
17.	"Two Against One"	4:51
18.	"Last Shot"	1:58
19.	"Godzilla's Victory"	3:03
20.	"Back To The Ocean"	3:40
Total length:		60:27

Songs featured in the film and not included in the soundtrack

#	Title	Performer(s)
1	"Glad About That"	Linda Ballentine
2	"Breakfast in Bed"	Dusty Springfield
3	"The Weathered Man"	The Holy Bridge Orchestra
4	"See the Way"	LikeWize
5	"Ka Huila Wai"	Israel Kamakawiwoʻole
6	"My Heart Can Feel the Pain"	The Tonettes
7	"(You're the) Devil in Disguise"	Elvis Presley
8	"Requiem for Soprano, Mezzo-Soprano, 2 Mixed Choirs and Orchestra" by György Ligeti	Frankfurt Radio Symphony Orchestra, Bavarian Radio Chorus

== Future ==
For the sequels in MonsterVerse, Godzilla: King of the Monsters (2019) and Godzilla vs. Kong (2021), Bear McCreary and Tom Holkenborg respectively composed the film scores for the counterparts. While McCreary used samples from Desplat's score in Godzilla, and had also incorporated Akira Ifukube's Godzilla themes, Holkenborg produced new themes for Godzilla vs. Kong, disregarding Ifukube's and Desplat's themes.

== Sources ==
- Kalat, David (2010). A Critical History and Filmography of Toho's Godzilla Series (Second ed.). McFarland. ISBN 9780786447497.
- Ryfle, Steve (1998). Japan's Favorite Mon-Star: The Unauthorized Biography of the Big G. ECW Press. ISBN 1550223488.
