= Net-SNMP =

- Original author: Wes Hardaker
- Developer: open source community
- Stable release: 5.9.4 / August 15, 2023; 2 years ago
- Written in: C, Perl, Python
- Operating system: Most
- Type: Network Management
- License: BSD licenses
- Website: www.net-snmp.org
- Repository: github.com/net-snmp/net-snmp

Net-SNMP is a suite of software for using and deploying the SNMP protocol (v1, v2c and v3 and the AgentX subagent protocol). It supports IPv4, IPv6, IPX, AAL5, Unix domain sockets and other transports. It contains a generic client library, a suite of command line applications, a highly extensible SNMP agent, perl modules and python modules.

== Distribution ==
Net-SNMP is housed on GitHub. It used to be housed on SourceForge, and it usually was in the top 100 projects in the SourceForge ranking system. It was the March 2005 SourceForge Project of the Month. It is very widely distributed and comes included with many operating systems including most distributions of Linux, FreeBSD, OpenBSD, Solaris, and OS X. It is also available from the Net-SNMP web site.

== History ==
Steve Waldbusser of CMU started a freely available SNMP tool kit in 1992. The package was later abandoned by CMU and Wes Hardaker at UC Davis renamed it to UCD-SNMP and extended it to meet the network management needs of the Electrical Engineering department there. Eventually Mr. Hardaker left the university and realized that the project was now network wide and thus renamed it to Net-SNMP to reflect its distributed development.

The roots of the Net-SNMP project are long and a full description can be found on the Net-SNMP history page.

== SNMP Applications Included With Net-SNMP ==
Application	Description
encode_keychange	Produce the KeyChange string for SNMPv3.
snmptranslate	Translate MIB OID names between numeric and textual forms.
snmpget	Communicates with a network entity using SNMP GET requests.
snmpgetnext	Communicates with a network entity using SNMP GETNEXT requests.
snmpbulkget	Communicates with a network entity using SNMP GETBULK requests.
snmpwalk	Retrieve a subtree of management values using SNMP GETNEXT requests.
snmpbulkwalk	Retrieve a subtree of management values using SNMP GETBULK requests.
snmpset	Communicates with a network entity using SNMP SET requests.
snmptrap	Sends SNMP TRAP or INFORM notification messages.
snmpd	An SNMP agent that responds to SNMP requests for a given host.
snmptrapd	An SNMP daemon that listens for SNMP TRAPs or INFORMs and logs or acts upon them.
snmptest	Communicates with a network entity using SNMP requests.
snmpusm	Manipulates the SNMPv3 User-based-security user table
snmpvacm	Manipulates the SNMPv3 View-based-access-control-module configuration tables
snmpdf	Displays disk information like the unix df tool using information collected from SNMP
mib2c	A MIB conversion utility that can translate MIB structures into other forms, such as C-code
tkmib	A perl/Tk interactive graphical MIB browser for SNMP.

=== Snmpget ===
The command snmpget uses the snmpget application to retrieve information associated with a specific object identifier (OID) from a target device.

==== Example ====
An example of snmpget usage (this will retrieve a specific OID 'sysUpTime' under the community string 'demopublic', with 'test.net-snmp.org' as the host name of the agent to query:

% snmpget -v 2c -c demopublic test.net-snmp.org SNMPv2-MIB::sysUpTime.0
SNMPv2-MIB::sysUpTime.0 = Timeticks: (586731977) 67 days, 21:48:39.77

=== Snmpwalk ===
The command snmpwalk uses the SNMP GETNEXT request to query a network for a tree of information.

An object identifier (OID) may be given on the command line. This OID specifies which portion of the object identifier space will be searched using GETNEXT requests. All variables in the subtree below the given OID are queried and their values presented to the user. If no OID argument is present, snmpwalk will search the subtree rooted at SNMPv2-SMI::mib-2 (including any MIB object values from other MIB modules, that are defined as lying within this subtree).

==== Example ====
An example of snmpwalk usage (this will retrieve all of the variables under the system OID):

$ snmpwalk -t 5 -Os -c demopublic -v 2c test.net-snmp.org system
sysDescr.0 = STRING: Linux test.net-snmp.org 2.6.18-164.el5 #1 SMP Thu Sep 3 03:28:30 EDT 2009 x86_64
sysObjectID.0 = OID: netSnmpAgentOIDs.10
sysUpTimeInstance = Timeticks: (34198503) 3 days, 22:59:45.03
sysContact.0 = STRING: Net-SNMP Coders
sysName.0 = STRING: test.net-snmp.org
sysLocation.0 = STRING: Undisclosed
