= Mimic (disambiguation) =

A mimic is any living species that has evolved to resemble another successful species.

Mimic may also refer to:

- To mimic, the process of observing and replicating another's behavior, also called imitation

== Arts, entertainment, and media ==
- Mimic, a synonym for impressionist, a performer who imitates a person for amusing or satirical effect

=== Fictional characters ===
- Mimic (Dungeons & Dragons), a creature in the Dungeons & Dragons role-playing game
- Mimic (Marvel Comics), a character in the Marvel Comics universe
- Mimics, fictional extraterrestrials in the Japanese science fiction novel All You Need Is Kill
- Mimic, a character in the video game franchise My Singing Monsters
- Mimic, a character in the Shantae video game franchise
- Mimic, a shapeshifter octopus from the IDW comics Sonic the Hedgehog
- The Mimic, the main antagonist in the Ruin extension of the video game Five Nights at Freddy's: Security Breach
  - "The Mimic", the title of the derivative third short story in Five Nights at Freddy's: Tales from the Pizzaplex #6 "Nexie"
  - Five Nights at Freddy's: Secret of the Mimic, 2025 video game

=== Films ===
- Mimic (film), a 1997 film
  - Mimic 2, film sequel
  - Mimic 3: Sentinel, film sequel
- The Mimic (2017 film), a South Korean film
- The Mimic (2020 film), an American comedy film
- Mimics (film), a 2025 American horror comedy film
- Mimics, an Indian Malayalam-language film series
  - Mimics Action 500 (1995), the first film in the series

=== Other uses in arts, entertainment, and media ===
- The Mimic, a ghost type in the video game Phasmophobia
- Mimic, a move in the video game series Pokémon
- Mimic, an enemy type in 2017 video game Prey
- Mimic (photograph), a 1982 photograph by Jeff Wall
- The Mimic (Roblox experience), a Roblox video game
- The Mimic (TV series), a 2013–14 British TV series

== Science and technology ==
=== Biology and healthcare ===
- MIMIC (immunology) (modular immune in vitro construct), a tool used by immunologists involved in vaccine development
- Mimicry, an evolved resemblance between an organism and another object
- Mimic, common name for the Asian butterfly Hypolimnas misippus

=== Computing ===
- MIMIC, a simulation computer language
- MIMIC Simulator, SNMP simulation software from Gambit Communications, Inc.

=== Statistics ===
- Multiple Indicators Multiple Causes model, a type of structural equation model

== See also ==
- Doppelgänger
- Imitation (disambiguation)
- Mimesis
  - Mimetic theory
