= Structure of Management Information =

In computing, the Structure of Management Information (SMI), an adapted subset of ASN.1, is a technical language used in definitions of Simple Network Management Protocol (SNMP) and its extensions to define sets ("modules") of related managed objects in a Management Information Base (MIB).

SMI subdivides into three parts: module definitions, object definitions, and notification definitions.

- Module definitions are used when describing information modules. An ASN.1 macro, MODULE-IDENTITY, is used to concisely convey the semantics of an information module.
- Object definitions describe managed objects. An ASN.1 macro, OBJECT-TYPE, is used to concisely convey the syntax and semantics of a managed object.
- Notification definitions (aka "traps") are used when describing unsolicited transmissions of management information. An ASN.1 macro, NOTIFICATION-TYPE, concisely conveys the syntax and semantics of a notification.

== Implementations ==
- libsmi, a C library for accessing MIB information
