= MML (programming language) =

A man–machine language (MML) is a specification language. MMLs are typically defined to standardize the interfaces for managing a telecommunications or network device from a console.

ITU-T Z.300 series recommendations define an MML, that has been extended by Telcordia Technologies (formerly Bellcore) to form Transaction Language 1.
