= Objective Systems Integrators =

OSI
- Type: Private company
- Industry: Software for Communications service providers, Operational Support Systems
- Headquarters: Northern California
- Products: NetExpert
- Website: www.osi.com

Objective Systems Integrators (OSI) was a multinational computer technology corporation that developed, manufactured, licensed, and supported software products which automate the monitoring, control, delivery, and management of services for multinational corporation service providers including:

- Wireless service providers
- IPTV service providers
- Transmission service providers

OSI was acquired by MYCOM and MYCOM OSI was formed in 2014.

== History ==
Objective Systems Integrators was founded in 1989.

=== Sobha Group ownership ===
OSI, a wholly owned subsidiary of the Sobha Group, develops and markets an OSS suite targeted for Communications Service Providers.

February 2008, Longview Software and OSI sign an Asset Purchase Agreement for OSI to acquire Longview intellectual property, products and technology. Longview software is a maker of off-the-shelf tools and custom applications that add value to many Operational Support System (OSS) and Business Support System (BSS) frameworks in the telecommunications industry.

=== Agilent Technologies ownership ===
Agilent acquired OSI in January 2001 for approximately $665 million. Agilent subsequently built an OSS business around this and other technology, but decided in 2007 to exit this market segment and focus on its test and measurement and life sciences businesses.

2001–2007, OSI is acquired by Agilent Technologies to help integrate Test and Measurement into the OSS market. OSI was under Agilent's OSS Division (Assurance Services Division) as a NETeXPERT Business Unit.

=== Pre-Agilent history ===
During the period of 1995–2001, OSI was traded on NASDAQ as OSII. OSI introduces the MASTER series of products to the market aligned around key technology areas such as fixed line networks, SONET/SDH network, and wireless networks. In 1997 OSI reached its 100th worldwide communications service provider (CSP) customer base.

1998–2001, OSI’s NetExpert Virtual Service Management (VSM), and Virtual Process Management (VPM) frameworks leverage the UMA (Unified Management Architecture). OSI introduces several new applications in key Communications Service Provider functional areas namely Fault management, Performance Management, Configuration Management, and Accounting Management.

== Products ==
OSI launches NetExpert Neon May 2009 for service assurance solutions focused on services and customers:

  - Service Health - Service Quality and Impact management leveraging industry standard portal technology for a holistic view of critical customer services.
  - Customer Health - Customer SLA, Experience Analysis, and Insight of corporations, groups within corporations, and individuals.

== See also ==
- Agilent Technologies
- Sobha Renaissance Information Technology
- Operations support systems
- Communications Service Provider
- Service management
- Expert system

== Reference Books ==
- Plunkett, J (1996). "Plunkett's Infotech Industry Almanac" - Page 75 Books
- Minoli, D, Golway, T, and Smith, N (1996) "Planning and Managing ATM Networks" - Google Books Prentice Hall PTR.
- Terplan, K (1998). "Telecom Operations Management Solutions with NetExpert" Amazon, Google Books CRC Press LLC
- Terplan, K (1999). "Web-Based Systems & Network Management" - Page 185 Google Books
- Terplan, K (1999). "Applications for Distributed Systems and Network Management" - Page 101 Google Books

Van Nostrand Reinhold
