= Agent Extensibility Protocol =

Computer network protocol

The Agent Extensibility Protocol, or AgentX, is a computer networking protocol that allows management of Simple Network Management Protocol objects defined by different processes via a single master agent. Agents that export objects via AgentX to a master agent are called subagents. The AgentX standard not only defines the AgentX protocol, but also the procedure by which those subagents process SNMP protocol messages.

For more information, see RFC 2741 for the original definition of the protocol and the IETF Agentx Working Group.

== See also ==
- Internet Engineering Task Force
- IETF RFC
