= Imitation (disambiguation) =

Imitation may refer to:

- Imitation in human and animal behavior
- Imitation (art), the fundamental artistic creativity doctrine which prescribes the close imitation of the masterpieces of the preceding authors
- Dionysian imitatio, by Dionysius of Halicarnassus, the first formulation, in the West, of the doctrine of imitation
- Mimesis, as theorized by Aristotle, the artistic imitation or representation of Nature
- Imitation (music), a form of musical repetition
- Imitations (album), a 2013 album by Mark Lanegan
- Imitation (film), a 2007 film directed by Frederico Hidalgo
- Imitation (TV series), a 2021 South Korean television series

== See also ==
- Fake (disambiguation)
- Imation, an American holding company
- Imitation Game (disambiguation)
- Mimicry (disambiguation)
