= Miracles (Coldplay song) =

Song by Coldplay

from the album Unbroken (Original Motion Picture Soundtrack)
- Released: 15 December 2014
- Recorded: 2014
- Genre: Pop rock
- Length: 3:56
- Label: Parlophone; Atlantic
- Songwriters: Guy Berryman; Jonny Buckland; Will Champion; Chris Martin
- Producers: Stargate; Daniel Green; Rik Simpson

Lyric video
- "Miracles" on YouTube

"Miracles" is a song by British rock band Coldplay, which was written and recorded for the 2014 drama film Unbroken, directed by Angelina Jolie. The song was first unveiled on 11 December 2014, and released separately from the film's soundtrack album on 15 December 2014 through Parlophone and Atlantic.

The song was accompanied by a lyric video, which was released on 22 December of the same year. It is also included on the Japanese edition of the band's seventh studio album A Head Full of Dreams (2015). It was well received by music critics, who praised its anthemic and uplifting feel. Several sources also commented that the track could be a serious contender for the Academy Award for Best Original Song. However, it ultimately did not receive a nomination.

== Background ==
On 28 October 2014, Coldplay announced on its official website that it would be releasing a song written and recorded especially for Unbroken, a film directed and produced by Angelina Jolie and telling the story of American Olympic distance runner and prisoner of war during World War II, Louis Zamperini. On 29 November 2014, Billboard and Gigwise wrote on their websites that a snippet of "Miracles" was used in a commercial for Sky Movies Christmas. However, Billboard later updated the article, stating that the song used in the ad was not Coldplay's.

== Release ==
On 11 December 2014, an audio track of "Miracles" was released on Coldplay's YouTube channel. It was also announced the song would be released on 15 December through Parlophone and Atlantic as a part of the Unbroken – Original Motion Picture Soundtrack album accompanying the film, and as a single-track iTunes download the same day.

== Critical reception ==
Eliza Berman of TIME magazine called the track "an anthemic tribute to the film's heroic protagonist," describing its sound as "poppy and easy on the ears, bordering on anthemic as it builds to a cathartic release in the final minute." She also commented, "If someone were to commission a song to play over the credits of a movie about heroic determination that comes out on Christmas Day, Coldplay's 'Miracles' would be it."

Rolling Stone magazine's Daniel Kreps wrote that "It's easy to picture 'Miracles,' which will likely generate some Best Song Oscar buzz, accompanying the Unbroken end credits," and described the song as "piano-driven," "gentle, uplifting" and "reminiscent of Coldplay's latest single 'Ink'."

Ryan Kristobak of The Huffington Post noted, "Sonically similar to the band's most recent album, Ghost Stories, 'Miracles' is a classic Coldplay mixture of sad, yet inspirational, with a dash more of the latter in keeping with the movie's story."

Radio.com's Shannon Carlin commented, "With a sweetly strummed guitar, a twinkling piano and a lot of snapping, this song sounds triumphant and as varied as the film itself. It also sounds ready for its Oscar moment. Frontman Chris Martin sings about angels that talk to him, lightning strikes and floating above the world. It's all pretty magical."

Tom Breihan of Stereogum called the song "a fairly generic uplift anthem that really just sounds like a Coldplay song," adding that "it's a more rhythmically focused Coldplay song than it has to be, and it's a bit surprising hearing the band trying out ideas on syncopation during an Oscar-season end-credits anthem."

== Personnel ==
Credits adapted from Qobuz.com

Coldplay

- Guy Berryman – all instruments
- Jonny Buckland – all instruments
- Will Champion – all instruments, vocals
- Chris Martin – all instruments, vocals

Additional musicians

- Tor Erik Hermansen – keyboards
- Mikkel S. Eriksen – keyboards

Technical personnel

- Stargate – production, additional programming
- Daniel Green – production, programming
- Rik Simpson – mixing, production, programming
- Bill Rahko – additional engineering
- Jaime Sickora – additional engineering
- Miles Walker – additional engineering
- Robin Baynton – additional engineering, mixing
- Roxy Pope – mixing
- Ted Jensen – mastering

== Charts ==
Weekly chart performance
Chart (2014)	Peak position
France (SNEP)	153
UK Singles (OCC)	95
US Bubbling Under Hot 100 (Billboard)	7
US Hot Rock & Alternative Songs (Billboard)	9
