= NetExpert =

- Developer: MYCOM OSI
- Stable release: 10.2 (October 2014)
- Written in: Java, C++,
- Operating system: UNIX; Linux, Windows clients
- Website: www.mycom-osi.com/products/netexpert

NetExpert monitors and controls networks and service impacting resources using object-oriented and expert systems technologies. It was originally developed by Objective Systems Integrators, later known as MYCOM OSI.

== Background ==
NetExpert is considered an OSS, used in managing wireline and wireless networks and services.

NetExpert is a scalable and distributable architecture that supports flexible configuration while maintaining individual component independence. Its application packages address many areas of communication services management, including fault, performance, reporting, activation, IP services, and others. These can be further tailored to individual customer environments and management requirements.

This framework consists of a set of integrated software modules and graphical user interface (GUI) development tools to enable the creation and deployment of complex management solutions. The object-oriented architecture of the NetExpert framework provides the building blocks to implement operations support and management systems using high-level tools rather than low-level programming languages.

The NetExpert framework is founded on open systems and object-oriented methodology. NetExpert supports different standards, transmission protocols, and equipment data models. NetExpert is based on the Telecommunications Management Network architecture created by the Telecommunications Standardization Sector of the International Telecommunication Union. It supports the development and deployment of applications for the main TMN management areas—fault, configuration, accounting, performance, and security—and the implementation of layered management architectures. In addition, the NetExpert framework employs expert rules and policies that replace complex programming languages and enable network analysts to model desired system behaviors by using GUI-based rule editors.

== See also ==
- Agilent Technologies
- Operations support system
- Communications service provider
- Service management
- Expert system

== Reference books ==
- Plunkett, J (1996). Plunkett's Infotech Industry Almanac - Page 75 Google Books
- Minoli, D, Golway, T, and Smith, N (1996) Planning and Managing ATM Networks - Google Books New York: Manning, 1997. ISBN 978-0-13262189-2.
- Terplan, K (1998). Telecom Operations Management Solutions with NetExpert Amazon, Google Books CRC Press LLC
- Terplan, K (1999). Web-Based Systems & Network Management - Page 185 Google Books
- Terplan, K (1999). Applications for Distributed Systems and Network Management - Page 101 Google Books
- Van Nostrand Reinhold
