= SNMP simulator =

Software that simulates devices supporting SNMP

An SNMP simulator is a type of computer simulation, that simulates the Simple Network Management Protocol (SNMP) agent. Contrary to network simulation, which models the behavior of a network within a computer, the SNMP simulator actually interfaces with outside systems, for example network management application software.

An SNMP simulator fools the network management application software into believing it is talking via the SNMP protocol to one or more devices, just like a flight simulator allows a pilot to believe they are flying a plane.

== Uses ==
SNMP Simulators are used for development, testing, and training of network management system software. Before the advent of simulators, actual physical equipment was used. The scalability of simulators dramatically reduces the cost in this area.

Features in this area vary widely, from the no-cost to commercial offerings. It is not uncommon for higher-end simulators to simulate thousands of devices on common PC hardware or virtual machines. Setting up any number of instances of any number of device type is standard functionality. The better simulators will allow creation of any type of dynamic scenario, both in terms of MIB object behavior as well as trap generation. Since current network management standards comprise a set of protocols, the better simulators integrate the current network management standards, such as NetFlow, command-line interfaces (CLI), etc.

Typically, SNMP simulators are deployed in laboratories which contain both Network Management Application software and devices to exercise the software for the above purposes.
