= Unbroken (soundtrack) =

Unbroken (Original Motion Picture Soundtrack)

Soundtrack album by Alexandre Desplat
- Released: December 15, 2014
- Genre: Film score
- Length: 60:48
- Label: Parlophone; Atlantic
- Producer: Alexandre Desplat

Alexandre Desplat chronology
The Imitation Game (2014)	Unbroken (2014)	Tale of Tales (2015)

Singles from Unbroken (Original Motion Picture Soundtrack)
- 1. "Miracles" Released: December 15, 2014

Unbroken (Original Motion Picture Soundtrack) is the soundtrack to the 2014 film of the same name directed by Angelina Jolie. The album featured original score composed by Alexandre Desplat, with an original song "Miracles" by the British rock band Coldplay was featured in the album as well as the film's end credits. It was released as a single on December 15, 2014, the same day as the soundtrack, distributed by Parlophone and Atlantic.

== Development ==
Desplat simultaneously worked on the film's score along with that of The Imitation Game, which he scored first. As both films based on real-life people and their life during World War II — Unbroken follows American Olympian and Army officer Louis "Louie" Zamperini (Jack O'Connell) survived multiple Japanese prisoner of war camps. He was not aware of the main character until he received the script, and when he discovered about the true story, he felt very excited and also praised Jolie's presentation of the script where "she wanted to make it more of a spiritual journey than a tale of bravery and action in war; it's more about resilience and how one man tries to survive", agreeing to do the film.

He described the film as "extremely moving to see this young man trying to survive through all the catastrophes he goes through". O'Connell and other principal cast members were in their late-20s and early-30s while filming, which Desplat said "These are heroes in their early twenties and it makes it very special to focus on their youth, risking so much peril, and Jack is in every shot. I wanted us to feel this deep energy that he had in his gut. Something that you can't see but is powerful because this young man could run a very long distance and always had this drive to keep pushing."

Jolie wanted the film's music to be subtle, and did not like temp music feeling that "Sometimes you can put too much temp on while you're editing and it's a cheat. Or you start editing to the temp music. I like to make sure a scene works in silence. So I left it very bare." On working with Desplat, she felt that "the music didn't get loud and bravado, but it got big and strong. He brought out the bigger nature of the film, allowing allow it to be a big movie." The importance of his music has been described in a plank scene, when the Bird started to hit Louie, she felt it as "upsetting" without Desplat's music and also praising him that he "was able to make the music inspiring; you realized when Louie was being beaten, his endurance meant he was actually winning. But it didn't do that without Alexandre's music."

== Original song ==
In addition to Desplat's score, the film also featured an original song written by Coldplay for the film in October 2014. The audio version of the aforementioned track "Miracles", was released onto Coldplay's official YouTube channel on December 11, 2014. The full single was released on December 15, along with the film's soundtrack and simultaneously released as a single-track digital download via iTunes on the same day, and a lyric video accompanying the single was released on December 22. The track was further included on the Japanese edition of the band's seventh studio album A Head Full of Dreams (2015). The song received positive response from music critics, and was intended to be a serious contender for the Academy Award for Best Original Song.

== Track listing ==
No.	Title	Performer(s)	Length
1.	"We Are Here"		1:49
2.	"Torrance Tornado"		2:55
3.	"Coming Home"		2:16
4.	"Olympic Kick"		3:47
5.	"God Made The Stars"		1:39
6.	"Surprise Mac Attack"		1:38
7.	"Albatross"		1:01
8.	"Mac's Death"		2:39
9.	"Solitary"		1:42
10.	"Making Gnocchi"		1:10
11.	"Drive To Radio Tokyo"		1:18
12.	"Japanese Attack"		3:30
13.	"Trip To Omori"		2:51
14.	"Bombing Tokyo"		1:42
15.	"Rain"		1:27
16.	"Dead Comrades"		2:19
17.	"To Naoetsu"		3:53
18.	"Broken Ankle"		2:20
19.	"The Bird's Farewell"		2:25
20.	"Radio Reading"		1:12
21.	"The Plank"		4:53
22.	"The War Is Over"		6:01
23.	"Unbroken"		2:26
24.	"Miracles"	Coldplay	3:55
Total length:			60:48

== Reception ==
Professional ratings
Review scores
Source	Rating
AllMusic	link

Callum Hofler of Entertainment Junkie stated, "At its finest, Unbroken is perhaps Desplat's strongest and most resonant emotional work since The Tree of Life or Harry Potter and the Deathly Hallows – Part 2, both from 2011. It comes off as bold, ambitious, yet intimate and sentimental all the same. It can be an elegant and harmonious exploration of human determination, drive and spirit." He also criticized numerous components, claiming that, "In most cases though, the primary issue with the album is its lack of energy and vitality. There is many a time where the music seems to just sit in place, lacking major progression in character, motive or mindset." He awarded the score a final rating of 6 out of 10. Jorn Tillnes of Soundtrack Geek acclaimed the album, stating, "This score is pretty great. It's been a really good year for Desplat. Godzilla and The Monuments Men at the top of the pile, but this is not far behind." He summarized with, "It is a turning point though for those who think Desplat is about boring bass rhythms and motifs. This might even get the haters to respect him as a composer." He awarded the score an 87.8 out of 100.

James Southall of Movie Wave summarised "With a bit of tight editing there'd be a pretty strong album here; as it is, it's certainly got its moments and is never bad, its chief problem is simply that it's just a bit too ordinary, a hamburger from a composer who usually cooks up a fillet steak." Timothy Monger of AllMusic stated: "The increasingly in-demand Desplat also scored the WWII caper The Monuments Men earlier in the year, but the tone he adopts for Unbroken is far different, relying heavily on warm, sentimental themes to accompany Zamperini's inspirational story. Playing back and forth between airy, atmospheric pieces and massive, theatrical swells, he uses far more light than darkness here and the result is a very melodic and motivational score. Heavy percussive sections accent the militaristic feeling and nimble wooden flutes accent many of the Japanese scenes."

Michael O'Sullivan of The Washington Post called Desplat's score "effective, yet vaguely mushy" as it "sounds like the button-pushing aural backdrop to any number of other poignant period films". Jeff Baker of The Oregonian and Colin Covert of Detroit Free Press called the score as "rousing" and "stunning". Marjorie Baumgarten of The Austin Chronicle said that Desplat "cues all the right emotions". Michael Phillips of Chicago Tribune commented: "Composer Alexandre Desplat's orchestral flourishes have a way of distancing and falsifying Zamperini's ordeal. When Mac (Finn Wittrock) receives his burial at sea, it's strange to be thinking about other matters, such as how much more effective the scene might be without mood music behind it."
