= Simple Gateway Monitoring Protocol =

Simple Gateway Monitoring Protocol (SGMP) is an early network management protocol for remote monitoring and limited control of Internet gateways (routers) in IP networks. SGMP was published in RFC 1028 by the Internet Activities Board (IAB) in November 1987. It provided a simple protocol structure for querying and setting a small set of management variables on gateways, laying a foundation for later network management standards.

== History ==
SGMP was specified by members of the Internet community under the coordination of the IAB and documented in RFC 1028, authored by J. Case, M. Fedor, C. Davin, and M. Schoffstall. The protocol addressed the need for remote monitoring of network devices as the early Internet grew in size and complexity. Before SGMP, operational data from routers was often gathered via ad hoc or proprietary methods. SGMP's publication provided a standardized, vendor-neutral method for network administrators to obtain status information and manage basic gateway functions. SGMP was used briefly before being replaced by the Simple Network Management Protocol (SNMP), introduced in RFC 1067 in 1988.

== Protocol overview ==
SGMP operates at the application layer and communicates using the User Datagram Protocol (UDP), typically over port 153. The protocol uses a simple manager–agent model, where a management station (manager) issues requests to, and receives notifications from, an agent process running on a gateway.

SGMP supports two basic data types: integer and octet string. Messages allow a manager to:

- Retrieve (Get) values of management variables
- Set values for certain writable variables
- Receive asynchronous notifications (Traps) on selected events

A community password is included in each message for access control; this password is transmitted in cleartext.

== Monitored objects ==
SGMP defines variables for monitoring and basic configuration of gateway interfaces and routing. Examples include:

- Interface type: IEEE 802.3 MAC, IEEE 802.4 MAC, IEEE 802.5 MAC, Ethernet, ProNET-80, ProNET-10, FDDI, X.25, Point-to-Point Serial, RPA 1822 HDH, ARPA 1822, AppleTalk, StarLAN
- Interface status: up, down, attempting, etc.
- Route type: local, remote, sub-network
- Routing protocol: RIP, EGP, GGP, IGRP, Hello

Other monitored variables include packet counters, error statistics, and basic performance information.

== Operation ==
SGMP's message flow consists of requests and responses between the manager and agent, and unsolicited Traps from the agent to the manager. Communication is stateless and unreliable; there is no session setup, guaranteed delivery, or retransmission, since UDP is used as transport. The protocol's minimalism was intentional to support implementation on resource-constrained devices typical of 1980s network equipment.

== Limitations ==
SGMP had several limitations, documented in its specification and later literature:

- No encryption; all management messages and passwords are transmitted as plain text.
- Fixed set of variables and types; difficult to extend for new features or evolving network technology.
- No structured Management Information Base (MIB); later addressed by SNMP.
- Lack of reliability due to use of UDP; applications had to compensate for potential message loss.

== Obsolescence and legacy ==
SGMP was rendered obsolete by SNMP, which was first standardized in 1988. SNMP provided a more extensible, structured, and widely adopted approach, supporting richer data models (MIB), a broader set of operations, and enhanced vendor interoperability. SGMP remains historically significant as a direct predecessor to SNMP and for its influence on the evolution of network management protocols.

== See also ==
- Simple Network Management Protocol
- Network management
- User Datagram Protocol
- Ethernet
- Routing Information Protocol
- RFC 1028
- RFC 1067
