= IEC 62379 =

Control protocol based on Simple Network Management Protocol

IEC 62379 is a control engineering standard for the common control interface for networked digital audio and video products. IEC 62379 uses Simple Network Management Protocol to communicate control and monitoring information.

It is a family of standards that specifies a control framework for networked audio and video equipment and is published by the International Electrotechnical Commission. It has been designed to provide a means for entering a common set of management commands to control the transmission across the network as well as other functions within the interfaced equipment.

== Organization ==
The parts within this standard include:

- Part 1: General,
- Part 2: Audio,
- Part 3: Video,
- Part 4: Data,
- Part 5: Transmission over networks,
- Part 6: Packet transfer service,
- Part 7: Measurement (for EBU ECN-IPM Group)

Part one is common to all equipment that conforms to IEC 62379 and a preview of the published document can be downloaded from the IEC web store here, a section of the International Electrotechnical Commission web site. More information is available at the project group web site.

== History ==
=== 2 October 2008 ===
Part 2, Audio has now been published and a preview can be downloaded from the IEC web store, a section the International Electrotechnical Commission web site.

=== 31 August 2011 ===
A first edition of Part 3, Video has been submitted to the IEC International Electrotechnical Commission technical committee for the commencement of the standardization process for this part. It contains the video MIB required by Part 7.

Part 7, Measurement, has been submitted to the IEC International Electrotechnical Commission technical committee for the commencement of the standardization process for this part. This part specifies those aspects that are specific to the measurement requirements of the EBU ECN-IPM Group, a member of the Expert Communities Networks. An associated document EBU TECH 3345 has recently been published by the EBU European Broadcasting Union.

=== 16 December 2011 ===
Part 3 (Document 100/1896/NP) and Part 7 (Document 100/1897/NP) have been approved by IEC TC 100.

=== 3 April 2014 ===
Part 5.2, Transmission over Networks - Signalling, has now been published and can be downloaded from the IEC web store,

=== 5 June 2015 ===
IEC 62379-3:2015 Common control interface for networked digital audio and video products - Part 3: Video has now been published and can be downloaded from the IEC web store.

=== 16 June 2015 ===
IEC 62379-7:2015 Common control interface for networked digital audio and video products - Part 7: Measurements has now been published and can be downloaded from the IEC web store. IEC 62379-7:2015 is the standardised (and extended) version of EBU TECH 3345 - End-to-End IP Network Measurement - MIB & Parameters, which can be obtained from here: published by the EBU European Broadcasting Union.
