= Alarm management =

Usability factor in alarm systems

Alarm management is the application of human factors and ergonomics along with instrumentation engineering and systems thinking to manage the design of an alarm system to increase its usability. Most often the major usability problem is that there are too many alarms annunciated in a plant upset, commonly referred to as alarm flood (similar to an interrupt storm), since it is so similar to a flood caused by excessive rainfall input with a basically fixed drainage output capacity. However, there can also be other problems with an alarm system such as poorly designed alarms, improperly set alarm points, ineffective annunciation, unclear alarm messages, etc.

== Alarm problem history ==
From their conception, large chemical, refining, power generation, and other processing plants required the use of a control system to keep the process operating successfully and producing products. Due to the fragility of the components as compared to the process, these control systems often required a control room to protect them from the elements and process conditions. In the early days of control rooms, they used what were referred to as "panel boards" which were loaded with control instruments and indicators. These were tied to sensors located in the process streams and on the outside of process equipment. The sensors relayed their information to the control instruments via analogue signals, such as a 4-20 mA current loop in the form of twisted pair wiring. At first these systems merely yielded information, and a well-trained operator was required to make adjustments either by changing flow rates, or altering energy inputs to keep the process within its designed limits.

Alarms were added to alert the operator to a condition that was about to exceed a design limit, or had already exceeded a design limit. Additionally, shutdown systems were employed to halt a process that was in danger of exceeding either safety, environmental or monetarily acceptable process limits. Alarm were indicated to the operator by annunciator horns, and lights of different colours. (For instance, green lights meant OK, Yellow meant not OK, and Red meant BAD.) Panel boards were usually laid out in a manner that replicated the process flow in the plant. So instrumentation indicating operating units with the plant was grouped together for recognition sake and ease of problem solution. It was a simple matter to look at the entire panel board, and discern whether any section of the plant was running poorly. This was due to both the design of the instruments and the implementation of the alarms associated with the instruments. Instrumentation companies put a lot of effort into the design and individual layout of the instruments they manufactured. To do this they employed behavioural psychology practices which revealed how much information a human being could collect in a quick glance. More complex plants had more complex panel boards, and therefore often more human operators or controllers.

Thus, in the early days of panel board systems, alarms were regulated by both size and cost. In essence, they were limited by the amount of available board space, and the cost of running wiring, and hooking up an annunciator (horn), indicator (light) and switches to flip to acknowledge, and clear a resolved alarm. It was often the case that if a new alarm was needed, an old one had to be given up.

As technology developed, the control system and control methods were tasked to continue to advance a higher degree of plant automation with each passing year. Highly complex material processing called for highly complex control methodologies. Also, global competition pushed manufacturing operations to increase production while using less energy, and producing less waste. In the days of the panel boards, a special kind of engineer was required to understand a combination of the electronic equipment associated with process measurement and control, the control algorithms necessary to control the process (PID basics), and the actual process that was being used to make the products. Around the mid 80's, we entered the digital revolution. Distributed control systems (DCS) were a boon to the industry. The engineer could now control the process without having to understand the equipment necessary to perform the control functions. Panel boards were no longer required, because all of the information that once came across analogue instruments could be digitised, stuffed into a computer and manipulated to achieve the same control actions once performed with amplifiers and potentiometers.

As a side effect, that also meant that alarms were easy and cheap to configure and deploy. You simply typed in a location, a value to alarm on and set it to active. The unintended result was that soon people alarmed everything. Initial installers set an alarm at 80% and 20% of the operating range of any variable just as a habit. The integration of programmable logic controllers, safety instrumented systems, and packaged equipment controllers has been accompanied by an overwhelming increase in associated alarms. One other unfortunate part of the digital revolution was that what once covered several square yards of panel space, now had to be fit into a 17-inch computer monitor. Multiple pages of information was thus employed to replicate the information on the replaced panel board. Alarms were used to tell an operator to go look at a page he was not viewing. Alarms were used to tell an operator that a tank was filling. Every mistake made in operations usually resulted in a new alarm. With the implementation of the OSHA 1910 regulations, HAZOPS studies usually requested several new alarms. Alarms were everywhere. Incidents began to accrue as a combination of too much data collided with too little useful information.

== Alarm management history ==
Recognizing that alarms were becoming a problem, industrial control system users banded together and formed the Alarm Management Task Force, which was a customer advisory board led by Honeywell in 1990. The AMTF included participants from chemical, petrochemical, and refining operations. They gathered and wrote a document on the issues associated with alarm management. This group quickly realised that alarm problems were simply a subset of a larger problem, and formed the Abnormal Situation Management Consortium (ASM is a registered trademark of Honeywell). The ASM Consortium developed a research proposal and was granted funding from the National Institute of Standards and Technology (NIST) in 1994. The focus of this work was addressing the complex human-system interaction and factors that influence successful performance for process operators. Automation solutions have often been developed without consideration of the human that needs to interact with the solution. In particular, alarms are intended to improve situation awareness for the control room operator, but a poorly configured alarm system does not achieve this goal.

The ASM Consortium has produced documents on best practices in alarm management, as well as operator situation awareness, operator effectiveness, and other operator-oriented issues. These documents were originally for ASM Consortium members only, but the ASMC has recently offered these documents publicly.

The ASM consortium also participated in development of an alarm management guideline published by the Engineering Equipment & Materials Users' Association (EEMUA) in the UK. The ASM Consortium provided data from their member companies, and contributed to the editing of the guideline. The result is EEMUA 191 "Alarm Systems- A Guide to Design, Management and Procurement".

Several institutions and societies are producing standards on alarm management to assist their members in the best practices use of alarms in industrial manufacturing systems. Among them are the ISA (ISA 18.2), API (API 1167) and NAMUR (Namur NA 102). Several companies also offer software packages to assist users in dealing with alarm management issues. Among them are DCS manufacturing companies, and third-party vendors who offer add-on systems.

== See also ==
- List of human-computer interaction topics, since most control systems are computer-based
- Design, especially interaction design
- Detection theory
- Physical security
- Annunciator panel
- Alarm fatigue
- Fault management
