= The Imitation Game (soundtrack) =

The Imitation Game (Original Motion Picture Soundtrack)

Film score by Alexandre Desplat
- Released: November 7, 2014
- Studio: Abbey Road Studios (London)
- Genre: Film score
- Length: 51:08
- Label: Sony Music Entertainment
- Producer: Alexandre Desplat

Alexandre Desplat chronology
Godzilla (2014)	The Imitation Game (2014)	Unbroken (2014)

The Imitation Game (Original Motion Picture Soundtrack) is the score album to the 2014 film of the same name. The film is scored by Alexandre Desplat who replaced the original composer Clint Mansell before the film's production commenced. The London Symphony Orchestra performed the original score that featured various instruments such as keyboard, percussions, drum, strings(violin and cello is most noticeable), and the triangle. The album was released on November 7, 2014 by Sony Music Entertainment. The album received critical acclaim and was nominated for several awards, including the Academy Award for Best Original Score but lost to The Grand Budapest Hotel, also composed by Desplat.

== Background ==
In September 2013, Clint Mansell was scheduled to score for The Imitation Game, but was replaced by Alexandre Desplat in June 2014. Desplat was initially scheduled to score for Unbroken, before signing for the film, but as production for the former got delayed, led him to do the film first. He was extremely moved and impressed by Tyldum's vision and preparation, though he had only three weeks before the film's production commences. He felt it as "extremely delicate" as the pace is being set to "jump over the rhythm of its film". As like his previous films, he creates his own demos and pre-orchestrate those tunes before recording it in studio.

As the film progresses over three periods in Turing's life, the structure of the film is extremely complex, where "there are a lot of flashbacks that resonate with something in the flashforwards needed to get a handle on the person". The film consisted of several layers that are "extremely nuanced", as the film follows several journeys, including the war, the Enigma code, Turing's trauma, calculations, dream for an invention of the century and his relationships, hence the music "needed to focus on him and keep all these elements within one theme".

== Composition ==
"The Imitation Game is about saving millions of people during the war, but I had to focus on him, so the score is very intimate and follows his emotions, his journey. The orchestra can play the larger drama of the story, which is the war, but the score really had to be focused on something very intimate within Benedict's character. You have a man whose plugged into this crazy period."

— Alexandre Desplat on the score for The Imitation Game

The score was recorded by the London Symphony Orchestra at Abbey Road Studios in London. Desplat used various instruments such as keyboards, clarinets, celeste, harp and fast arpeggio. The opening track consisted of a keyboard theme which was descended, rippled and appear as multiple variations in later tracks, the first being accompanied by string music. He suggested a mix of funk and acoustic in the piano — the electric piano, the bases, all these things, that are computerized, and thought "someone playing the piano would be too romantic or classical. The piano line is beautiful and different yet trying to keep simplicity and compliance at the same time, and the film has that." For the track "Enigma", Desplat and his musicians create sounds of the sonar pinging depicting the ability of the Enigma code to keep the German U-boats hidden beneath the waves unharmed as they sent warships and transport vessels underwater. A track titled "Crossword" is a complex arrangement of instruments that sounds to evoke Turing's mind.

He wanted the score to be soulful and tragic, with the young Alan (Alex Lawther) and his friend Christopher (Jack Bannon). The sequence where Alan learns of Christopher's death was one of his favourites, where he used a variation on Christopher's theme. He further said "The camera pulls onto Alan's face when he learns of his passing and it's incredibly moving. That's something that comes from a long journey that starts from the first playing of the film." His machine named Christopher (named after his friend), which was the real life Bombe, was a musical instrument in itself, that hums and pounds a marital percussive beat. Desplat said "When I heard the sound from the wheels turning, we added this electronic sound on top of that pounding sound. We wanted to bring excitement and suspense and danger and expectation to that sound, as it's a very important moment in the film."

== Track listing ==
No.	Title	Length
1.	"The Imitation Game"	2:37
2.	"Enigma"	2:50
3.	"Alan"	2:57
4.	"U-boats"	2:12
5.	"Carrots and Peas"	2:19
6.	"Mission"	1:36
7.	"Crosswords"	2:52
8.	"Night Research"	1:39
9.	"Joan"	1:45
10.	"Alone with Numbers"	2:58
11.	"The Machine Christopher"	1:57
12.	"Running"	3:01
13.	"The Headmaster"	2:27
14.	"Decrypting"	2:01
15.	"A Different Equation"	2:54
16.	"Becoming a Spy"	4:08
17.	"The Apple"	2:20
18.	"Farewell to Christopher"	2:41
19.	"End of War"	2:07
20.	"Because of You"	1:36
21.	"Alan Turing's Legacy"	1:56
Total length:		51:08

== Reception ==
James Southall of Movie Wave wrote "Throughout the whole score there is such clarity to the writing – I never cease to be amazed that a composer of Desplat's phenomenal orchestral gifts has managed to forge such a successful career in these dumbed-down times. He's the real deal and The Imitation Game is yet another triumph, emotional and dramatic and a showcase for his phenomenal compositional gifts." MFiles wrote "There's a vivid sense that Desplat got to know Turing's character intimately, knowledge that allowed him to depict the man's triumphs and complexities with his characteristic musical intelligence. There's a sense of sadness pervading the score that's achingly moving, yet even the most poignant moments shine through with genuine compassion, offset against which are the darker, more complex textures depicting Enigma and the spectre of World War II itself. Consistently engaging and thought-provoking, Desplat's music is well-deserving of its Golden Globe and Oscar nominations." Music critic Jonathan Broxton of Movie Music UK wrote "The Imitation Game is one of the strongest drama scores of 2014, and if the film receives as much critical acclaim as it is predicted to receive, Desplat will likely receive his seventh Oscar nomination for it."

Filmtracks.com wrote "there is a clear narrative structure to Desplat's The Imitation Game, the secondary theme a challenge to appreciate out of context, perhaps, but the redeeming primary identity closing out the album on an optimistic note. The performances by the London Symphony Orchestra have to be singled out for their precision, and the mixing of the work is not quite as dry as usual for Desplat (in fact, the celeste has an other-worldly ambient position in the mix). For film music collectors, much of what is heard in this work may seem like Desplat's usual, but the usual in this case is the composer in top form on short notice." Erin Corrado of The Joy of Movies wrote "Alexandre Desplat's music for The Imitation Game is a hauntingly beautiful piece of work that helps to elevate the film to one of the best of the year. Perfectly encapsulating the story and Benedict Cumberbatch's performance as Alan Turing, Desplat's quiet score features simple melodies expanded throughout on a variety of string instruments heightened with smooth piano sections." Pete Simons of Synchrotones called it as "a magnificent album, from a melodic, rhythmic, compositional and orchestrations point of view".

== Accolades ==
Award	Date of ceremony	Category	Recipients	Result	Ref.
87th Academy Awards	22 February 2015	Best Original Score	Alexandre Desplat	Nominated	
20th Critics' Choice Movie Awards	15 January 2015	Critics' Choice Movie Award for Best Score	Alexandre Desplat	Nominated	
72nd Golden Globe Awards	11 January 2015	Golden Globe Award for Best Original Score	Alexandre Desplat	Nominated	
18th Hollywood Film Awards	14 November 2014	Hollywood Film Composer Award	Alexandre Desplat	Won	
Houston Film Critics Society Awards	12 January 2015	Best Original Score	Alexandre Desplat	Nominated	
International Film Music Critics Association Awards	19 February 2015	Best Original Score for a Drama	Alexandre Desplat	Nominated	
19th Satellite Awards	15 February 2015	Best Original Score	Alexandre Desplat	Nominated	
