= Element management system =

Telecoms network management system

An element management system (EMS) operates at the network element management layer (NEL) of the Telecommunications Management Network (TMN) architecture, as defined in the ITU-T M.3010 recommendation, which specifies the overall framework, providing a standard model for managing network elements (NE) in a consistent and interoperable manner.

An EMS implements portions of the FCAPS functional model (fault, configuration, accounting, performance, and security management) relevant to the network elements under its control, while higher-level functions may be handled by either network management systems (NMS) or service management systems depending on the deployment scenario.

In TMN architecture, a southbound interface (EMS → NE) allow the EMS to communicate with an individual network element, whereas a northbound interface (EMS → NMS) enable integration with an NMS or OSS/BSS system, facilitating end-to-end network management and service provisioning.

An element management system manages one or more of a specific type of telecommunications network element. Typically, the EMS manages the functions and capabilities within each NE but does not manage the traffic between different NEs in the network. To support management of the traffic between itself and other NEs, the EMS communicates upward to higher-level network management systems (NMS) as described in the telecommunications management network layered model. The EMS provides the foundation to implement TMN–layered operations support system (OSS) architectures that enable service providers to meet customer needs for rapid deployment of new services, as well as meeting stringent quality of service (QoS) requirements. The TeleManagement Forum common object request broker architecture (CORBA) EMS–to–NMS interface heralds a new era in OSS interoperability by making the TMN architecture a practical reality.

== Examples of elements which can be managed through the EMS interfaces ==
- Cable telephony
- media gateway
- Softswitch
- Video compression technology provider
- Wireless broadband provider
- Smart electricity meters

NMSs provides an integrated system for sharing device information across management applications, automation of device management tasks, visibility into the health and capability of the network, and identification and localization of network trouble. By using common centralized systems and network-inventory knowledge, an NMS delivers a platform of cross-functional management capabilities that reduces network administration overhead. An EMS is a carrier class management service. It is capable of scaling as the network grows, maintaining high performance levels as the number of network events increase, and providing integration with other systems.

== See also ==
- Network engineering
