= HP Network Management Center =

Network management software

- Developers: Hewlett-Packard, HP Software Division
- Final release: 9.1
- Operating system: Windows, Linux, Solaris, Red Hat Linux, HP-UX
- Type: Network management tools
- License: Proprietary

HP Network Management Center (NMC) is a suite of integrated HP software used by network managers in information technology departments. The suite allows network operators to see, catalog and monitor the routers, switches, and other devices on their network. IT staff is alerted when a network device fails, and it predicts when a network node or connection point may go down. The suite was designed to address operational efficiency.

HP no longer packages its network management suite as HP Network Management Center. HP now offers automation, orchestration, and cloud management software for automating the lifecycle of IT services. HP's software assets first became part of Hewlett Packard Enterprise and then Micro Focus

== Products ==
=== HP Security and Compliance Service ===
The HP BSA Security and Compliance subscription service attacks IT vulnerabilities through automation, providing industry compliance and security alerts to HP Business Service Automation (BSA) software. Alerts come from vendor bulletins and from agencies like the National Vulnerability Database, PCI Security Standards Council and the Center for Internet Security.

=== HP Database and Middleware Automation Software ===
Originally acquired from Stratavia in 2010, HP Database and Middleware Automation software automates administrative tasks like provisioning and configuration, compliance, patching and release management associated with databases and application servers. Version 10 was announced in May 2013.

=== HP Network Automation Software ===
HP Network Automation software is designed to simplify the management of complex, distributed, multi-vendor networks in large enterprise data centers. It provides process-powered automation to automate the complete operational lifecycle of network devices from provisioning to policy-based change management, compliance and security administration.

=== HP Network Node Manager i Software ===
HP Network Node Manager i (NNMi) 10.00 and the HP NNMi Smart Plug-in modules use continuous spiral discovery, a network discovery technology that provides up-to-date network topology and root cause analysis. This allows network administrators to ascertain the level of congestion in their networks and identify the root cause of the congestion. The product helps IT departments monitor their networks, isolate issues, find outages and improve network availability and performance. The software supports a multitenancy architecture, including tenant user-level map and incident security, and allows teams to manage more customers, departments or sites from one console.

=== HP Network Node Manager i Smart Plug-in Modules ===
HP Network Node Manager i Smart Plug-in Modules (iSPIs) extend HP Network Node Manager i software’s (NNMi) fault and availability management with HP NNM iSPIs for performance and advanced network services. The HP Smart Plug-ins integrate fault, availability, performance and advanced network services for physical and virtualized network infrastructure. They allow network operators to determine and display network fault, availability, performance and advanced services status in one view, progress through a unified workflow, and drill down in context.

=== HP Automated Network Management Software ===
HP Automated Network Management (ANM) software bundles HP Network Node Manager i, HP Network Automation and several HP Smart Plug-ins to unify network fault, availability, change, configuration, compliance, performance monitoring and automated diagnostics into a single solution package. HP Network Node Manager i delivers a common console for unified fault, performance and configuration of IT networks. The second product in the bundle is the HP NNM iSPIs for Performance (metrics, traffic, quality assurance), designed to monitor and ensure performance of the network. The third product in the bundle is the HP iSPI Network Engineering Toolset (NET), which automates common operator tasks, and provides trap analytics and map export capabilities. HP Network Automation, which handles network change and configuration management, is the fourth product in the bundle.

=== HP Operations Orchestration Software ===
HP Operations Orchestration software creates “runbooks” that automate the provisioning of infrastructure so deployment can be both faster and more automated than previously. Version 10, announced in May 2013, has out-of-the-box support for over 5,000 IT operations, including Amazon S3 Storage, HP ArcSight, HP Fortify, OpenStack and SAP applications.

=== HP Server Automation Software ===
HP Server Automation software provides enterprise server lifecycle automation for tasks such as provisioning, patching, configuration and compliance. Version 10, announced in May 2013, allows organizations to deploy and maintain the patching and updating of thousands of servers. This version can also update virtual servers that are sleeping as well as are active.

In May 2013, HP also released HP Server Automation software as an appliance, called HP Server Automation Standard. It includes much of the core configuration, deployment and compliance checking functionality found in the full software edition.

=== HP Storage Essentials Suite ===
HP Storage Essentials is a single tool that provides storage optimization and capacity planning. In June 2013, HP announced version 9.6, which expanded support for third-party storage arrays, including EMC VNX block storage and Brocade Access Gateway. It also provided deeper integration with HP 3Par, HP 6000 EVA and further management server development support for Oracle and SAP Business Objects.
