= Alarm fatigue =

Psychological consequence of overuse of alarms

Alarm fatigue or alert fatigue describes how busy workers (in the case of health care, clinicians) become desensitized to safety alerts, and as a result ignore or fail to respond appropriately to such warnings. Alarm fatigue occurs in many fields, including construction and mining (where vehicle back-up alarms sound so frequently that they often become senseless background noise), healthcare (where electronic monitors tracking clinical information such as vital signs and blood glucose sound alarms so frequently, and often for such minor reasons, that they lose the urgency and attention-grabbing power which they are intended to have), and the nuclear power field. Like crying wolf, such false alarms rob the critical alarms of the importance they deserve. Alarm management and policy are critical to prevent alarm fatigue.

== Healthcare ==
The constant sounds of alarms and noises from blood pressure machines, ventilators and heart monitors causes a "tuning out" of the sounds due to the brain adjusting to stimulation. This issue is present in hospitals, in home care providers, nursing homes and other medical facilities alike. The US Food and Drug Administration cataloged 566 deaths from ignored alarms in the period 2005 to 2008. The United States-based Joint Commission's sentinel event reports 80 alarm-related deaths and 13 alarm-related serious injuries over the course of a few years. On 18 April 2013, the Joint Commission issued a sentinel event alert that highlighted the widespread problem of alarm fatigue in hospitals. Their recommendations included establishing guidelines to tailor alarm settings, training all members of the clinical team on safe use of alarms, and sharing information about alarm-related incidents. This alert resulted in designation in 2014 of clinical alarm system safety as a National Patient Safety Goal and it remains a goal in 2017. This Goal will force hospitals to establish alarm safety as a priority, identify the most important alarms, and establish policies to manage alarms by January 2016. ECRI Institute has listed alarms on its "Top Ten Hazards List" since 2007; in 2014, alarms were listed as the number one hazard.

=== Unintended outcomes of alarms ===
The large number of alarms, especially of false alarms, has led to several unintended outcomes. Some consequences are disruption in patient care, desensitization to alarms, anxiety in hospital staff and patients, sleep deprivation and depressed immune systems, misuse of monitor equipment including "work-arounds" such as turning down alarm volumes or adjusting device settings, and missed critical events. Some additional outcomes include workload increase, interference with communication, wasted time, patient dissatisfaction, and unnecessary investigations, referrals, or treatments.

== Child abduction ==
The Amber alert system used in countries such as the United States and Canada to notify the public of a child abduction has been theorized as being susceptible to alarm fatigue. A 2018 abduction in Thunder Bay resulted in an amber alert being sent to cell phones as far away as Ottawa, some 15 hours' drive from Thunder Bay, followed one hour later by a second alert which notified individuals that the first alert had been resolved. A similar double alert occurred on a single night in February 2019, leading to concerns over alert fatigue.

== Public transport ==
In the New York City Subway, the Metropolitan Transportation Authority installed sirens in 2006 to discourage subway users from using emergency exits to evade fares; the sirens had little effect other than irritating passengers and were removed in 2015. By 2026, announcements on the trains' public address systems had proliferated to the point that 25% of a typical ride was polluted with announcements, especially ineffective exhortations to refrain from smoking, be aware of theft, or avoid subway surfing, or the trumpeting of useless factoids such as the metro system's having 100 disability-accessible stations. (Misuse of public address systems to blast irrelevant announcements itself presents an accessibility issue for visually impaired riders.)

Alarm fatigue has sometimes contributed to public transport disasters such as the 2009 train collision in Washington, DC, caused by a faulty track circuit which failed to detect the presence of a stopped train. Though the automatic train control system generated alerts notifying train dispatchers to the presence of such faulty circuits, the rate of such alerts was about 8,000 per week. An investigation by the US National Transportation Safety Board concluded that "the extremely high incidence of track-circuit alarms would have thoroughly desensitized [the dispatchers]".

== Weather ==
Researchers think the large number of deaths from Hurricane Ida in the US states of New York and New Jersey may have been the result of too many warnings. Since 2012, weather alerts have been sent out to cell phones, but in 2020, federal officials set up a three-tier system so people would get this warning for the most serious situations.

== Smoke alarms ==
The 2023 Loafers Lodge fire in Wellington, New Zealand, killed 5 people. A contributing factor was a slow initial response caused by frequent false alarms from the building's smoke alarm system. A survivor stated "The smoke alarm did go off, but it often went off and people didn't realise at first it meant there was a fire ...[t]he alarm they keep going every week, two times, three times, there's no good management there."

== Warning labels ==
A law passed by referendum in the US state of California in 1986, Proposition 65, requires corporations to place a warning label on products containing certain chemicals that could cause cancer or birth defects. Many companies now routinely attach such warning labels to any product that might possibly contain one of the 900 listed chemicals without testing to see whether the chemical is really present in their product and without reformulating their product, because it is cheaper to do so than to run the risk of being sued by Proposition 65 enforcers. The law has been criticized for causing "over-warning" due to encouraging "meaningless warnings." There is no penalty for posting an unnecessary warning sign, and to the extent that warnings are vague or overused, they may not communicate much information to the end user.

== See also ==
- Alarm management – Usability factor in alarm systems
- Banner blindness – Tendency to ignore banner-size notices
- Compassion fatigue – Condition characterized by emotional and physical exhaustion
- False alarm – Deceptive or erroneous report of an emergency
- Habituation – Decrease in a behavioral response to a repeated stimulus
- Inattentional blindness – Condition of failing to see something in plain view
- Information overload – Decision making with too much information
- Normalization of deviance – Sociological phenomenon
- Semantic satiation – Psychological phenomenon
