= Carrier grade open framework =

Carrier grade open framework (CGOF) is a hardware-independent architecture for the telecommunications industry. CGOF is based on a collection of open standards and is offered as a basis for new solution development. CGOF specifies the functional components needed to create next generation network (NGN) solutions, the relationship of those components to each other, and the interfaces among the components.
