= Management agent =

A Management agent is a software agent that runs on a managed node (example: a router) and provides an interface to manage it. It can perform operations on managed objects in the node and can also forward notifications to the manager (EMS).

The agent software usually resides in the flash memory of telecommunications devices.

== See also ==
- Software agent
