= Network management application =

In the network management model, a network management application (NMA) is the software that sits on the network management station (NMS) and retrieves data from management agents (MAs) for the purpose of monitoring and controlling various devices on the network. It is defined by the ISO/OSI network management model and its subset of protocols, namely Simple Network Management Protocol (SNMP) and Common Management Information Protocol (CMIP).
