= Telecommunications Management Network =

Protocol model

The Telecommunications Management Network is a protocol model defined by ITU-T for managing open systems in a communications network. It is part of the ITU-T Recommendation series M.3000 and is based on the OSI management specifications in ITU-T Recommendation series X.700.

TMN provides a framework for achieving interconnectivity and communication across heterogeneous operations system and telecommunication networks. To achieve this, TMN defines a set of interface points for elements which perform the actual communications processing (such as a call processing switch) to be accessed by elements, such as management workstations, to monitor and control them. The standard interface allows elements from different manufacturers to be incorporated into a network under a single management control.

For communication between Operations Systems and NEs (Network Elements), it uses the Common management information protocol (CMIP) or Mediation devices when it uses Q3 interface.

The TMN layered organization is used as fundamental basis for the management software of ISDN, B-ISDN, ATM, SDH/SONET and GSM networks. It is not as commonly used for purely packet-switched data networks.

Modern telecom networks offer automated management functions and are run by operations support system (OSS) software. These manage modern telecom networks and provide the data that is needed in the day-to-day running of a telecom network. OSS software is also responsible for issuing commands to the network infrastructure to activate new service offerings, commence services for new customers, and detect and correct network faults.

== Architecture ==
According to ITU-T M.3010 TMN has 3 architectures:

Physical architecture
Security architecture
Logical layered architecture

== Logical layers ==
The framework identifies four logical layers of network management:

Business management
Includes the functions related to business aspects, analyzes trends and quality issues, for example, or to provide a basis for billing and other financial reports.
Service management
Handles services in the network: definition, administration and charging of services.
Network management
Distributes network resources, performs tasks of: configuration, control and supervision of the network.
Element management
Handles individual network elements including alarm management, handling of information, backup, logging, and maintenance of hardware and software.

A network element provides agent services, mapping the physical aspects of the equipment into the TMN framework.

== Recommendations ==
The TMN M.3000 series includes the following recommendations:

- M.3000 Tutorial Introduction to TMN
- M.3010 Principles for a TMN
- M.3020 TMN Interface Specification Methodology
- M.3050 Business Process Framework (eTOM)
- M.3060 Principles for the Management of the Next Generation Networks
- M.3100 Generic Network Information Model for TMN
- M.3200 TMN Management Services Overview
- M.3300 TMN Management Capabilities at the F Interface

== See also ==
- Simple Network Management Protocol (SNMP)
- Common management interface protocol (CMIP, X.700)
