= Association Control Service Element =

Association Control Service Element (ACSE) is the OSI method for establishing a call between one application programs. ACSE checks the identities and contexts of the application entities, and could apply an authentication security check.
