= The Grand Budapest Hotel (soundtrack) =

2014 soundtrack album by Alexandre Desplat

The Grand Budapest Hotel: Original Soundtrack

Soundtrack album by Alexandre Desplat
- Released: March 4, 2014
- Studios: Air Studios; Abbey Road Studios (London); Studio Guillaume Tell (Paris)
- Genre: Soundtrack
- Length: 59:50
- Label: ABKCO
- Producers: Wes Anderson; Randall Poster

The Grand Budapest Hotel: Original Soundtrack is the soundtrack album composed by Alexandre Desplat for the 2014 film The Grand Budapest Hotel directed by Wes Anderson. The 32-track album was released on March 4, 2014, through ABKCO Records, produced by Anderson along with music supervisor Randall Poster. Unlike their previous ventures, the soundtrack to this film did not feature contemporary pop hits due to the classical roots of the film's music.

The film marked Desplat's third collaboration with Anderson after Fantastic Mr. Fox (2009) and Moonrise Kingdom (2012). It consisted of a classical score emulating Central European regions and utilized exotic instruments from the country, particularly the balalaika, which formed the musical core.

A critical success, the soundtrack fetched Desplat his first Academy Award for Best Original Score at the 87th Academy Awards after eight nominations. He also won the Grammy Award for Best Score Soundtrack for Visual Media, and the BAFTA Award for Best Original Music, among numerous other accolades. It has been considered as one of Desplat's best original scores.

== Background and production ==
For The Grand Budapest Hotel, composer Alexandre Desplat was tasked with creating a score that articulated the Republic of Zubrowka, a fictional country in Central Europe, that represented an amalgamation of Czechia, Hungary, Poland, Russia, and Germany.

Very early on, when I read the script he mentioned some kind of a sound that would emerge from Mitteleuropa ... And Mitteleuropa, for that film goes from Switzerland to Turkey. It's a wide band of land in which there are instruments and rhythms and melodies that you can quickly identify, of course you can think of the zither, the balalaikas, the percussion instruments that come also from the east, the Alpenhorns. It was all these things put together in a big, big, big pot. When you start mixing them together it becomes kind of a strange, special, weird sound. And that's what we were excited to do.

— Alexandre Desplat, on The Grand Budapest Hotel score composition process with Wes Anderson

To underscore the folk sound of the film, Desplat and music supervisor Randall Poster made heavy use of the balalaika, a stringed instrument used extensively in Russian folk music; it served as the core of the film's music palette. Poster admitted the instrument had "more primal humanity and to enduring human values that have nothing to do with fashion" and it juxtaposed with Antonio Vivaldi's music in one of the tracks. Since both Anderson and Poster were not purely anchored in the world of classical folk music, they spent six months consulting various experts to hone their vision. Desplat assembled a 50-person ensemble of French and Russian balalaika players, which required the presence of two translators. The score was further performed by the members from the Osipov State Russian Folk Orchestra, along with several exotic instruments being utilised by Desplat including zithers, cimbaloms, and alphorns, and sampled recordings of folk music.

== Release ==
I think it speaks to evolving culture, it speaks to folklore, it speaks to this sort of mythical foreign identity that we were trying to channel [...] And there's just sort of the magic of it. It's a great sound and underused and works really nicely as a counterpart to some of the more sophisticated classical pieces.

— Randall Poster, on the film's soundtrack

ABKCO Records published the film's soundtrack on March 4, 2014, three days before the film's release. The album featured 32 tracks, which are mostly selections from the original score and rearrangements of classical pieces. On February 18, 2014, a track from the film score "Canto at Gabelmeister's Peak" premiered through The Wall Street Journal website. Two days later, "Moonshine" from the soundtrack debuted through Rolling Stone. The soundtrack was further debuted exclusively through Pitchfork, on February 25, 2014, a week before the official release. The soundtrack is also available in CD and vinyl LP formats.

== Reception ==
=== Critical reception ===
The album received critical acclaim, with several publications regarded it as "the best soundtrack of 2014". It is also labelled as one of Desplat's best soundtracks by Far Out and Time Out. Music critic Jonathan Broxton commented that the score certainly follows the trend established with Desplat and Anderson's previous ventures "with its metronomically precise rhythms and almost child-like music box instrumental ideas". Sean Wilson from Music Files called it as "one of the most accessible" from the composer's works, that "possessed of a character that's effervescent, odd and surprisingly touching in equal measure". In a four-star rating, James Southall of Movie Wave wrote "While the music may feel like a relatively light meal compared with Desplat's more usual banquets, it's so perfectly judged it's actually very fulfilling and if you're one of the people it catches, you'll find yourself frequently returning for more."

Gissane Sophia of Marvelous Geeks Media wrote "With a brilliant mixture of fun and steadily slow, the soundtrack is one of Desplat's most outstanding pieces to date and a Wes Anderson original score that won't be forgotten anytime soon". Heather Phares of AllMusic also gave a four-star rating, commenting that the collaboration between Desplat, Anderson and Poster "sets the mood perfectly, whether that mood is innocence, mischief, mystery, or beauty." Filmtracks.com gave a three-star rating saying, "this smirk-inducing score has much to love and much to loathe, and it is the type of work that really has to be appreciated in context to avoid possible acceleration of any mental disorders you might be predisposed to having."

Peter Bradshaw of The Guardian commented that the score "keeps the picture moving at an exhilarating canter". Justin Chang of Variety, commented that Desplat "has concocted an unusually inventive score that combines a wide range of Central and Eastern European instruments, reaching a delirious crescendo toward the end of the closing credits." Eric Kohn of IndieWire and Dana Stevens of Slate described the music as "jangly" and "lush". Todd McCarthy writing for The Hollywood Reporter commented that Desplat's "energetic work meshes very effectively with swaths of classical and ethnic music". Richard Corliss of Time wrote "Alexandre Desplat's score, heavy on the balalaikas, is worth enjoying up to and through the closing credits."

=== Accolades ===
Award	Date of ceremony	Category	Recipient(s)	Result	Ref.
Academy Awards	February 22, 2015	Best Original Score	Alexandre Desplat	Won	
Alliance of Women Film Journalists	January 12, 2015	Best Film Music or Score	Alexandre Desplat	Nominated	
British Academy Film Awards	February 8, 2015	Best Film Music	Alexandre Desplat	Won	
Chicago Film Critics Association Awards	December 15, 2014	Best Original Score	Alexandre Desplat	Nominated	
Grammy Awards	February 8, 2015	Best Score Soundtrack for Visual Media	Alexandre Desplat	Won	
Houston Film Critics Society Awards	January 10, 2015	Best Original Score	Alexandre Desplat	Won	
International Film Music Critics Association Awards	February 19, 2015	Film Score of the Year	Alexandre Desplat	Nominated	
International Film Music Critics Association Awards	February 19, 2015	Best Original Score for a Comedy	Alexandre Desplat	Won	
San Diego Film Critics Society Awards	December 15, 2014	Best Score	Alexandre Desplat	Nominated	
St. Louis Gateway Film Critics Association Awards	December 15, 2014	Best Music Score	Alexandre Desplat	Nominated	
World Soundtrack Awards	October 25, 2014	Best Original Score of the Year	Alexandre Desplat	Won	

== Track listing ==
All tracks are written by Alexandre Desplat, except where noted.

Original release
No.	Title	Length
1.	"s'Rothe-Zäuerli" (Ruedi Roth & Werner Roth, performed by Öse Schuppel)	1:12
2.	"The Alpine Sudetenwaltz"	0:36
3.	"Mr. Moustafa"	3:03
4.	"Overture: M. Gustave H"	0:30
5.	"A Prayer for Madame D"	1:20
6.	"The New Lobby Boy"	2:17
7.	"Concerto for Lute and Plucked Strings I. Moderato" (Antonio Vivaldi, performed by DZO Chamber Orchestra (cond. Siegfried Behrend))	2:52
8.	"Daylight Express to Lutz"	2:16
9.	"Schloss Lutz Overture"	0:32
10.	"The Family Desgoffe Und Taxis"	1:49
11.	"Last Will and Testament"	2:16
12.	"Up the Stairs/Down the Hall"	0:27
13.	"Night Train to Nebelsbad"	1:44
14.	"The Lutz Police Militia"	0:49
15.	"Check Point 19 Criminal Internment Camp Overture"	0:11
16.	"The Linden Tree" (Pavel Kulikov, performed by the Osipov State Russian Folk Orchestra (cond. Vitaly Gnutov))	2:24
17.	"J.G. Jopling, Private Inquiry Agent"	1:28
18.	"A Dash of Salt (Ludwig's Theme)"	1:32
19.	"The Cold-Blooded Murder of Deputy Vilmos Kovacs"	2:47
20.	"Escape Concerto"	2:12
21.	"The War (Zero's Theme)"	1:01
22.	"No Safe-House"	1:32
23.	"The Society of the Crossed Keys"	2:21
24.	"M. Ivan"	1:15
25.	"Lot 117"	0:30
26.	"Third Class Carriage"	1:20
27.	"Canto at Gabelmeister's Peak"	5:35
28.	"A Troops Barracks (Requiem for the Grand Budapest)"	5:18
29.	"Cleared of All Charges"	1:10
30.	"The Mystical Union"	1:26
31.	"Kamarinskaya" (Mikhail Glinka, performed by the Osipov State Russian Folk Orchestra (cond. Vitaly Gnutov))	2:43
32.	"Moonshine" (Traditional, arr. Alexandre Desplat)	3:21
Total length:		59:50
