= Associative memory =

Associative memory may refer to:

- Associative memory (psychology), the ability to learn and remember the relationship between unrelated items
- Associative storage, or content-addressable memory, a type of computer memory used in certain very high speed searching applications
- Autoassociative memory, all computer memories that enable one to retrieve a piece of data from only a tiny sample of itself
- Bidirectional associative memory, a type of recurrent neural network
- Hopfield network, a form of recurrent artificial neural network
- Transderivational search in psychology or cybernetics, a search for a fuzzy match across a broad field
