= Network Processing Forum =

The Network Processing Forum (NPF) is an industry forum that was organized to facilitate and accelerate the development of next-generation networking and telecommunications products based on network processing technologies. The NPF was merged into the Optical Internetworking Forum in June 2006. The NPF produces Hardware, Software, and Benchmark Interoperability Agreements. These agreements enable equipment manufacturers to lower their time to market and development cost by enabling a robust, multi-vendor ecosystem. It also lowers the total cost of ownership of systems based on their interoperability agreements by enabling investments in test and verification infrastructure as well as enabling competition.

== History of the NPF ==
The organization was formed to build on the efforts of two former industry groups, the Common Programming Interface Forum (CPIX) and the Common Switch Interface Consortium (CSIX). Chuck Sannipoli then of IBM was the first chairman of the NPF. Misha Nossik then of Solidum Systems, later acquired by Integrated Device Technology was the second chairman of the NPF. Many of the original meetings were held in the Drake Hotel in Chicago, Illinois. The NPF was later absorbed by the Optical Internetworking Forum (OIF) in June 2006.

== Organizational form ==
The NPF is a member-managed non-profit corporation and operates as a contribution-driven, parliamentary industry forum. Russell Dietz of HiFn is the current chairman and Chuck Sannipoli representing IP Infusion is the vice-chairman. The NPF's board was composed of representatives of Ericsson, HiFn, IBM, Integrated Device Technology, Intel, IP Infusion, and PMC-Sierra.

== Hardware interoperability agreements ==
The Look-Aside Interface (LA) is used by Network Processing Elements (NPE)s to access Network Search Elements, of which CAMs are an example. The Streaming Interface (NPF-SI) is used by NPEs to talk to each other and to framing devices and to switching devices.

== Software interoperability agreements ==
Service Application Programming Agreements, (SAPI)s, provide an API to configure or use a service. The following SAPIs have been approved by the NPF:

- Interface Management API, IPSec Service API, HA Service API, Diffserv Services API, IPv4 Unicast Forwarding Service API, IPv6 Unicast Forwarding Service API, MPLS Forwarding Service API,

Functional APIs, (FAPI)s, are used to configure or use a low level functional block. The following FAPIs have been approved by the NPF:

- IPv4 Prefix LPF and FAPI, Generic Classifier LFB and FAPI, Topology Manager FAPI, Messaging LFB,

== Benchmarking interoperability agreements ==
The NPF has created benchmarks for IP forwarding, IPSEC performance, MPLS forwarding, and switch fabric performance.

== Joint projects ==
The NPF specified a High Availability framework and service API in conjunction with the Service Availability Forum (SAF). The NPF has also had extensive liaison activity with the Optical Internetworking Forum. In December 2004, the NPF became a founding member of the Mountain View Alliance, a consortium of consortia created to enable Commercial off-the-shelf (COTS) solutions.

== See also ==
- CSIX
