= RMI Corporation =

- Logo with original name
- Founded: 2002; 24 years ago
- Founder: S. Atiq Raza
- Fate: Merged into NetLogic Microsystems, then Broadcom
- Products: Network processors

RMI Corporation, formerly Raza Microelectronics, Inc., was a privately held fabless semiconductor company headquartered in Cupertino, California, which specialized in designing system-on-a-chip processors for computer networking (known as network processors) and consumer media applications.

== History ==
Atiq Raza was Hired as the CEO of NexGen in 1991, NexGen was later acquired by AMD in 1995. Raza was AMD's president and chief operating officer in the late 1990s after the NexGen acquisition. He left AMD in 1999 and founded Raza Microelectronics, Inc. in 2002. In 2003, SandCraft Inc folded, and Raza acquired the rights to its intellectual property. Behrooz Abdi became president and CEO in November 2007, and Raza Microelectronics changed its name to RMI Corporation in December 2007. In January 2008 Raza settled with the U.S. Securities and Exchange Commission over an allegation of insider trading during 2006. RMI was not affiliated with Foundries Holdings, LLC, formerly known as Raza Foundries, Inc.

Most of RMI's revenue came from its multi-core processor product line, which had major customers from China including Huawei, ZTE, and H3C. The China business of RMI was built from scratch by its co-founder Sunny Siu. In 2008, RMI merged with NetLogic Microsystems, which was acquired by Broadcom in 2012.

== Product lines ==
RMI had four product lines: three developed internally and one acquired.

The XLR (introduced circa 2005) was a multicore, multithreaded CPU used for network processing. XLR integrated circuits had 2 to 8 MIPS architecture CPU cores, each extended to support 4 hardware threads. XLR processors included HyperTransport, PCI-X, Gigabit Ethernet, and IEEE floating point unit per core and optionally 10 Gigabit Ethernet interconnects. A 2.0 GHz clock rate for the XLP was announced in May 2009.

The XLS was a smaller, lower-cost multicore multithreading MIPS-based CPU used for network processing. The XLS family had options with 1 or 2 CPU cores, each with 4 hardware threads; 2 to 8 Gigabit Ethernet interfaces or two 10-gigabit Ethernet interfaces; and 1 or 2 PCI-Express interfaces. The XLS processor was widely used in Huawei's LTE base stations.

The Alchemy processor was originally developed by Alchemy Semiconductor, which was then purchased by AMD. This product line was purchased by RMI in 2006. The Alchemy processor is a low-power MIPS architecture system-on-a-chip with integrated graphics and signal processing, designed for media players and portable video devices.

The Orion network interface chip was used to translate Gigabit Ethernet data traffic to synchronous optical networking (SONET/SDH) Optical Carrier OC-48 network links and back again, to connect local area networks with wide area network circuits.

RMI processors were used in router, firewall, and switch products sold by other networking equipment vendors, and consumer electronics manufacturers.
