= KBP =

KBP or kbp may refer to:

== Businesses and organisations ==
- KBP Instrument Design Bureau, a weapons manufacturer
- Kapisanan ng mga Brodkaster ng Pilipinas, the Association of Broadcasters in the Philippines
- Kappa Beta Pi, a legal association and former sorority
- Kilby Block Party, yearly music festival in Salt Lake City, Utah, United States of America.

== Other uses ==
- Kabye language, spoken in West Africa (ISO 639-3:kbp)
- Kilo-base pair (kb or kbp), a unit of measure of DNA or RNA
- Knowledge-based processor, in computer networking
- Boryspil International Airport, near Kyiv, Ukraine (IATA:KBP)
