= SandCraft =

SandCraft, Inc.
- Industry: RISC microprocessors
- Founded: 1996
- Headquarters: Santa Clara, California, United States
- Key people: Norman Yeung, Mayank Gupta, Paul H.F. Vroomen
- Products: Semiconductor intellectual property
- Number of employees: 80

SandCraft, Inc., was a Silicon Valley–based fabless semiconductor design company designer of microprocessors that were used as computing engines in electronics products utilizing the MIPS architecture and a series of RISC CPU chips. The markets targeted were consumer electronics, office automation, and communications applications, including Nintendo game consoles.

On 29 July 2003, SandCraft, Inc. was acquired by Raza Microelectronics Inc, which, in turn, was acquired by NetLogic Microsystems in 2008, which itself was acquired by Broadcom in 2012.

== Name ==
SandCraft was named as such because sand represented silicon, the critical substrate in microprocessors, and craft to denote a design house.

== History ==
Norman Yeung founded SandCraft, along with Mayank Gupta as chief architect in 1996. Microprocessors with Floating point units were designed verified and contracted out to Asian manufacturing based on MIPS IV, with 64 bit instruction sets, and a later processor called SR71000, which was at the time the world's highest performance MIPS processor. They incorporated superscalar, multi-staged pipeline design, and big/little endian support modes.
