= Chuck Sannipoli =

Charles Joseph Sannipoli (1945–2015) was an executive in the computer networking industry, having served for more than 3 decades in many roles.

== Life ==
He held a Bachelor of Electrical Engineering degree from the Georgia Institute of Technology and was a Senior Member of the IEEE. He was a resident of North Carolina.

Sannipoli completed a long career at IBM during which he held key senior management positions in the networking business area, spanning hardware and software research and development, as well as product and program management. He was involved in IBM's Rainier network processor development effort. He holds several patents and has patents pending in IBM's portfolio based on network processing technology.

Sannipoli served as the vice president and general manager of the Network Processor Group at IP Infusion Inc. This is a firm which specialized in delivering software to the communications and networking marketplace. It was sold to the Japanese company Access in 2006.

Sannipoli was instrumental in the creation of, and was the initial chairman of the Network Processing Forum (NPF), a position he held until his departure from IBM. The NPF is the standards body dedicated to creating a standards-oriented marketplace around the emerging technology of Network Processing. He was reelected to the NPF board of directors in June 2002 on behalf of IP Infusion and was elected to serve as chairman again in 2005. The NPF merged with the Optical Internetworking Forum (OIF) in June 2006, and Sannipoli was elected to the OIF board of directors in October 2006.

He died on December 8, 2015.

Preceded by None	Chairman, Network Processing Forum; 2000–2001	Succeeded by Misha Nossik
Preceded by None	Vice Chairman, Network Processing Forum; 2002–2005	Succeeded by Harmeet Bhugra
Preceded by Misha Nossik	Chairman, Network Processing Forum; 2005–Merger with OIF	Succeeded by none
