= Solidum Systems =

Solidum Systems was a fabless semiconductor company founded by Feliks Welfeld and Misha Nossik in Ottawa, Ontario Canada in 1997. The company developed a series of rule-based network classification semiconductor devices. Some of their devices could be found in systems which supported 10 Gbit/s interfaces.

Solidum was acquired in October 2002 by Integrated Device Technology. IDT closed the Ottawa offices supporting the product in March 2009.

Misha Nossik was also the second chairman of the Network Processing Forum. The NPF also released the Look-Aside Interface which is an important specification for Network Search Elements such as Solidum's devices.

== Products ==
Solidum produced a set of Traffic Classification devices called the PAX.port 1100, PAX.port 1200, and PAX.port 2500

The classifier chips were used in Network Switches and Load Balancers.
