= CSIX =

The common switch interface (CSIX) is a physical interface specification between a traffic manager (network processor) and a switching fabric. It was developed by the Network Processing Forum to:

- promote development and deployment of highly scalable network switches
- permit hardware and software interoperability
