= Content processor =

Content processors are sometimes confused with network processors that inspect the packet payload of an IP packet travelling through a computer network.

These components allow for the design and deployment of next-generation networking systems that can make packet or message processing decisions based on an awareness of the packet or message content. The work of Content Processors is often termed Content Processing or Deep Packet Inspection, DPI, though some people feel that the expression DPI is too limiting as many Content Processors can modify and re-write content on the fly - therefore they can do much more than just inspect which implies a sort of monitoring only function.

Unlike knowledge based processors or Ternary Content-addressable memory (TCAMS), which mainly target the packet header (twenty percent of the packet currently comprises the header), content processors go much further into the packet or message thereby determining the nature of the content in the packet itself (80% of the packet currently is data).

Applications of content processors include: layer 7 application, application-oriented networks switches, routers, unified threat management (UTM) computer appliances, Intrusion Detection, prevention systems (IDS/IPS), anti-virus, compliance, [VOIP] and XML gateways. The various layers of the OSI model are given in the link that follows with a description of layer 7 where content processing is and will become and integral part of the intelligent network as the next generation networks mature.

Advanced Content Processors can both examine and transform content. For example: Microsoft's new Office 2007 product has the ability to save documents in an open XML format, instead of .ppt, .xls and .doc applications will save to an encapsulated (actually ZIP) file type named .pptx, .xlsx and .docx. So a content processor could be used to examine all of a corporations documents and replace one company name with another, or change an included corporate logo - all because the structured data represented in XML can be manipulated much more easily than a proprietary and undocumented format. XML is often described as a self-describing language.

Some Content Processors support the ability to handle both message-based or packet-by-packet analysis and some can keep track of content across multiple packets so that the signatures they may be searching for can cross packet boundaries and they will still be found.

== See also ==
- Network processor
- Multi core Processor
- Knowledge-based processor
