= Look-Aside Interface =

The Look-Aside Interface is a computer interface that was specified by an interface interoperability agreement produced by the Network Processing Forum. It specifies the method to interface a Network Processing Element (of which an NPU is an example) to a Network Search Element (of which a CAM is an example). The interface is used by devices that off-load certain tasks from the network processor.

Numerous devices which implement the LA interface have been produced. Companies which have implemented these devices include Integrated Device Technology and Cypress Semiconductor.

== External Reference ==
- NPF LA-1 Interface Interoperability Agreement
