= Inter-network processors =

Inter-network processors are special-purpose processors which aid in the interconnection of telecommunications networks. Most commonly used inter-network processors are switches, bridges, hubs, routers and gateways.

Switches act as interfaces for communication between telecommunications circuits in a networked environment. In addition, most modern switches have integrated network managing capabilities and may operate on numerous layers of the OSI reference model. Switches usually come as managed or unmanaged. Unmanaged switches commonly have no management interface and/or configuration options, while their counterparts offer interfaces for modification of switch operation.

A bridge can connect numerous local area networks for the purpose of collaboration and/or exchange of information. However, the local area networks must be using the same sets of communication rules or protocols for a bridge interconnection to be successful. In slight contrast, routers are considered intelligent communications processors, which do the same thing as bridges do, namely connect two or more networks, but they allow specification of different protocols to be required factors in the interconnection process rather than the entire protocol suite. Routers are generally optimized for Ethernet LAN interfaces and are likely not to contain any other types of physical interfaces.

Hubs are communications processors which allow for port-switching, similarly to switches. Both of these processors support automatic port-switching in order to provide shared resources access to the users of a particular networked environment. However, hubs do not manage traffic so every packet that enters any port is in output on every other port, resulting in packet collisions that interrupt the flow of traffic.

When networks do not use the same protocols for the purpose of communication, they can be connected via gateways, using protocol conversion processes. In addition, gateways require congruent or at least mutually acceptable administrative procedures between the interconnecting networks. The duties of a gateway are usually much more complex than those of switches or routers.
