= STARAN =

STARAN in the information technology industry might be the first commercially available computer designed around an associative memory. The STARAN computer was designed and built by Goodyear Aerospace Corporation. It is a content-addressable parallel processor (CAPP), a type of parallel processor which uses content-addressable memory. STARAN is a single instruction, multiple data array processor with a 4x256 1-bit processing element (PE) computer. The STARAN machines became available in 1972.

Goodyear Aerospace later developed the MPP based on similar principles but with a larger and wider processor array.

== See also ==
- Index of computing articles
- Outline of computers
- Outline of computing
