= Lernmatrix =

Lernmatrix (German for "learning matrix") is a special type of artificial neural network (ANN) architecture, similar to associative memory, invented around 1960 by Karl Steinbuch, a pioneer in computer science and ANNs.

This model for learning systems could establish complex associations between certain sets of characteristics (e.g., letters of an alphabet) and their meanings.

== Function ==
The Lernmatrix generally consists of n "characteristic lines" and m "meaning lines," where each characteristic line is connected to each meaning line, similar to how neurons in the brain are connected by synapses. (This can be realized in various ways – according to Steinbuch, this could be done by hardware or software).

To train a Lernmatrix, values are specified on the corresponding characteristic and meaning lines (binary or real); then the connections between all pairs of characteristic and meaning lines are strengthened by the Hebb rule. A trained Lernmatrix, when given a specific input on the characteristic lines, activates the corresponding meaning lines. In modern language, it is a linear projection module.

By appropriately interconnecting several Lernmatrices, a switching system can be built that, after completing certain training phases, is ultimately able to automatically determine the most probable associated meaning for an input sequence of features.

== See also ==
- Artificial neural networks
