= Fuzzy cognitive map =

Type of cognitive map

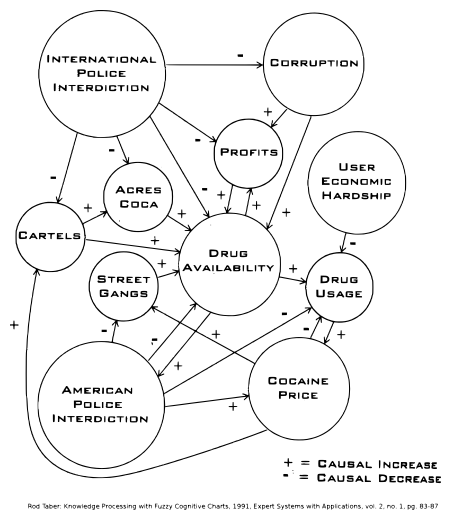
Rod Tabers FCM depicting eleven factors of the American drug market

A fuzzy cognitive map (FCM) is a cognitive map within which the relations between the elements (e.g. concepts, events, project resources) of a "mental landscape" can be used to compute the "strength of impact" of these elements. Fuzzy cognitive maps were introduced by Bart Kosko. Robert Axelrod introduced cognitive maps as a formal way of representing social scientific knowledge and modeling decision making in social and political systems, then brought in the computation.

== Details ==
Fuzzy cognitive maps are signed fuzzy directed graphs. Spreadsheets or tables are used to map FCMs into matrices for further computation. FCM is a technique used for causal knowledge acquisition and representation, it supports causal knowledge reasoning process and belong to the neuro-fuzzy system that aim at solving decision making problems, modeling and simulate complex systems. Learning algorithms have been proposed for training and updating FCMs weights mostly based on ideas coming from the field of Artificial Neural Networks. Adaptation and learning methodologies used to adapt the FCM model and adjust its weights. Kosko and Dickerson (Dickerson & Kosko, 1994) suggested the Differential Hebbian Learning (DHL) to train FCM. There have been proposed algorithms based on the initial Hebbian algorithm; others algorithms come from the field of genetic algorithms, swarm intelligence and evolutionary computation. Learning algorithms are used to overcome the shortcomings that the traditional FCM present i.e. decreasing the human intervention by suggested automated FCM candidates; or by activating only the most relevant concepts every execution time; or by making models more transparent and dynamic.

Fuzzy cognitive maps (FCMs) have gained considerable research interest due to their ability in representing structured knowledge and model complex systems in various fields. This growing interest led to the need for enhancement and making more reliable models that can better represent real situations. A first simple application of FCMs is described in a book of William R. Taylor, where the war in Afghanistan and Iraq is analyzed. In Bart Kosko's book Fuzzy Thinking, several Hasse diagrams illustrate the use of FCMs. As an example, one FCM quoted from Rod Taber describes 11 factors of the American cocaine market and the relations between these factors. For computations, Taylor uses pentavalent logic (scalar values out of {-1,-0.5,0,+0.5,+1}). That particular map of Taber uses trivalent logic (scalar values out of {-1,0,+1}). Taber et al. also illustrate the dynamics of map fusion and give a theorem on the convergence of combination in a related article.

While applications in social sciences introduced FCMs to the public, they are used in a much wider range of applications, which all have to deal with creating and using models of uncertainty and complex processes and systems. Examples:

- In business FCMs can be used for product planning and decision support.
- In economics, FCMs support the use of game theory in more complex settings.
- In education for modeling Critical Success Factors of Learning Management Systems.
- In medical applications to model systems, provide diagnosis, develop decision support systems and medical assessment.
- In engineering for modeling and control mainly of complex systems and reliability engineering
- In project planning FCMs help to analyze the mutual dependencies between project resources.
- In robotics FCMs support machines to develop fuzzy models of their environments and to use these models to make crisp decisions.
- In computer assisted learning FCMs enable computers to check whether students understand their lessons.
- In expert systems a few or many FCMs can be aggregated into one FCM in order to process estimates of knowledgeable persons.
- In IT project management, a FCM-based methodology helps to success modelling, risk analysis and assessment, IT scenarios

FCMappers is an international online community for the analysis and the visualization of fuzzy cognitive maps. FCMappers offer support for starting with FCM and also provide a Microsoft Excel-based tool that is able to check and analyse FCMs. The output is saved as Pajek file and can be visualized within third party software like Pajek, Visone, etc. They also offer to adapt the software to specific research needs.

Examples of FCM software tools:

- Mental Modeler, have recently been developed as a decision-support tool for use in social science research, collaborative decision-making, and natural resource planning.
- fuzzymap, an opensource browser based tool for creating and sharing FCM, which allows running simulations on the FCM.

== See also ==
- Causal diagram
- Causal loop diagram
- System dynamics
- Cognitive map
