= Network search engine =

Computer networks are connected together to form larger networks such as campus networks, corporate networks, or the Internet. Routers are network devices that may be used to connect these networks (e.g., a home network connected to the network of an Internet service provider). When a router interconnects many networks or handles much network traffic, it may become a bottleneck and cause network congestion (i.e., traffic loss).

A number of techniques have been developed to prevent such problems. One of them is the network search engine (NSE), also known as network search element. This special-purpose device helps a router perform one of its core and repeated functions very fast: address lookup. Besides routing, NSE-based address lookup is also used to keep track of network service usage for billing purposes, or to look up patterns of information in the data passing through the network for security reasons .

Network search engines are often available as ASIC chips to be interfaced with the network processor of the router. Content-addressable memory and Trie are two techniques commonly used when implementing NSEs.
