= Knowledge-based processor =

Knowledge-based processors (KBPs) are used for processing packets in computer networks. Knowledge-based processors are designed to increase the performance of the IPv6 network. By contributing to the build-out of the IPv6 network, KBPs provide the means for an improved and secure networking system.

== Standards ==
All networks are required to perform the following functions:

1. IPv4/IPv6 multilayer packet/flow classification
2. Policy-based routing and Policy enforcement (QoS)
3. Longest Prefix Match (CIDR)
4. Differentiated Services (DiffServ)
5. IP Security (IPSec)
6. Server Load Balancing
7. Transaction verification

All of the above functions must occur at high speeds in advanced networks. Knowledge-based processors contain embedded databases that store information required to process packets that travel through a network at wired speeds. Knowledge-based processors are a new addition to intelligent networking that allows these functions to occur at high speeds and at the same time provide for lower power consumption.

Knowledge-based processors currently target the 3rd layer of the 7-layer OSI model which is devoted to packet processing.

== Advantages ==
The advantages that knowledge-based processors offer are the ability to execute multiple simultaneous decision-making processes for a range of network-aware processing functions. These include routing, Quality of Service (QOS), access control for both security and billing, as well as the forwarding of voice/video packets. These functions improve the performance of advanced Internet applications in IPv6 networks such as VOD (Video on demand), VoIP (voice over Internet protocol), and streaming of video and audio.

Knowledge-based processors use a variety of techniques to improve network functioning such as parallel processing, deep pipelining, and advanced power management techniques. Improvements in each of these areas allow for existing components to carry on their functions at wired speeds more efficiently thus improving the performance of the overall network.

The databases in a knowledge-based processor include classification tables, forwarding tables, and exact match tables- all of which are utilized by the CPU and network processors.

Knowledge-based processors mainly process packet headers (20% of the packet approximately) which enables network awareness. Content processors, by contrast, allow for packet payload inspection (80% of the packet is data) and therefore must search "deeper" into the packet.

== See also ==
- Network processor
- Multi core processor
- Content processor
