= Campus network =

Computer network linking smaller networks on a campus

A campus network, campus area network, corporate area network or CAN is a computer network made up of an interconnection of local area networks (LANs) within a limited geographical area. The networking equipments (switches, routers) and transmission media (optical fiber, copper plant, Cat5 cabling etc.) are almost entirely owned by the campus tenant / owner: an enterprise, university, government etc. A campus area network is larger than a local area network but smaller than a metropolitan area network (MAN) or wide area network (WAN).

== University campuses ==
College or university campus area networks often interconnect a variety of buildings, including administrative buildings, academic buildings, laboratories, university libraries, or student centers, residence halls, gymnasiums, and other outlying structures, like conference centers, technology centers, and training institutes.

Early examples include the Stanford University Network at Stanford University, Project Athena at MIT, and the Andrew Project at Carnegie Mellon University.

== Corporate campuses ==
Much like a university campus network, a corporate campus network serves to connect buildings. Examples of such are the networks at Googleplex and Microsoft's campus. Campus networks are normally interconnected with high speed Ethernet links operating over optical fiber such as gigabit Ethernet and 10 Gigabit Ethernet.

== Area range ==
The range of CAN is 1 to 5 km (1 to 3 mi). If two buildings have the same domain and they are connected with a network, then it will be considered as CAN only. Though the CAN is mainly used for corporate campuses so the link will be high speed.
