= Associative memory (psychology) =

Ability to learn associations between unrelated objects

In psychology, associative memory is defined as the ability to learn and remember the relationship between unrelated items. This would include, for example, remembering the name of someone or the aroma of a particular perfume. This type of memory deals specifically with the relationship between these different objects or concepts. A normal associative memory task involves testing participants on their recall of pairs of unrelated items, such as face-name pairs. Associative memory is a declarative memory structure and episodically based.

== Conditioning ==
Two important processes for learning associations, and thus forming associative memories, are operant conditioning and classical conditioning. Operant conditioning refers to a type of learning where behavior is controlled by environmental factors that influence the behavior of the subject in subsequent instances of the stimuli. In contrast, classical conditioning is when a response is conditioned to an unrelated stimulus.

== Location and circuitry ==
The neuroanatomical structures that govern associative memory are found in the medial temporal lobe and functionally connected cortical areas. The main locations are the hippocampus and its surrounding structures of the entorhinal, perirhinal, and parahippocampal cortices. More recently, the parietal-hippocampal network has been identified as a key circuit for associative memory Humans with large medial temporal lobe lesions have shown to have impairments in recognition memory for different types of stimuli. The hippocampus has also shown to be the main location for memory consolidation, especially related to episodic memory. The inputs from these unrelated stimuli are collected in this location and the actual synaptic connections are made and strengthened. Additionally, involvement from the prefrontal cortex, frontal motor areas, and the striatum has been shown in the formation of associative memories. Associative memory is not considered to be localized to a single circuit, with different types of subsets of associative memory utilizing different circuitry.

== Biological basis ==
The associations made during the learning process have a biological basis that has been studied by neuroscientists for the last few decades. The convergence of the biologically important information drives the neural plasticity that is the basis of associative memory formation.

== Research and future work ==
Associative memory becomes poorer in humans as they age. Additionally, it has been shown to be non-correlational with a single item (non-associative) memory function. Non-invasive brain stimulation techniques have emerged as promising tools for the improvement of associative memory. Transcranial direct-current stimulation over prefrontal cortex has improved performance on associative memory tasks, but recent studies that stimulated posterior parietal cortex showed more reliable effects. Patients with Alzheimer's disease have been shown to be poorer in multiple forms of associative memory.

== Mathematical models ==
Starting from Hopfield’s work, mathematical modeling of memory formation and retrieval has been in the center of attention. For a long time, the ability to establish the relationship between unrelated items has been considered as an emergent feature of the nonlinear dynamics of large neural networks. More recent experimental discovery of the so-called concept or grandmother cells ascribes some functions in episodic memory to single neurons. Mathematical modeling of grandmother cells confirms that single neurons can indeed implement associative memory. The associative property emerges in large assemblies of single neurons receiving a multidimensional synaptic input from afferent populations and synaptic plasticity obey the Hebbian rule.

== See also ==
- Stroop effect
