= Integrated Device Technology =

U.S. semiconductor manufacturer

Integrated Device Technology, Inc.
- Type: Subsidiary
- Traded as: Nasdaq: IDTI
- Industry: Semiconductor industry
- Founded: 1980; 46 years ago
- Defunct: 2019
- Fate: Acquired by Renesas Electronics
- Headquarters: San Jose, California, United States
- Key people: Sailesh Chittipeddi (president & CEO)
- Revenue: ▲US$ 728.24 million (APR 2 2017)
- Operating income: ▼US$ 110.34 million (APR 2 2017)
- Net income: ▼US$ 110.48 million (APR 2 2017)
- Total assets: ▲US$ 1.18 billion (APR 2 2017)
- Total equity: ▲US$ 773.66 million (APR 2 2017)
- Number of employees: 1,623 (APR 2 2017)
- Parent: Renesas Electronics

Integrated Device Technology, Inc. (IDT) was an American semiconductor company headquartered in San Jose, California. The company designed, manufactured, and marketed low-power, high-performance mixed-signal semiconductor products for the advanced communications, computing, and consumer industries. The company marketed its products primarily to original equipment manufacturers (OEMs). Founded in 1980, the company began as a provider of complementary metal-oxide semiconductors (CMOS) for the communications business segment and computing business segments. The company focused on three major areas: communications infrastructure (wireless and wired), high-performance computing, and advanced power management. Between 2018 and 2019, IDT was acquired by Renesas Electronics.

== Business segments ==
The communications segment produces communication clocks, serial RapidIO products for wireless base station infrastructure applications, radio frequency products, digital logic products, first-in and first-out (FIFO) memories, integrated communications processors, static random-access memory (SRAM) products, and telecommunications semiconductor products. This segment markets its products to the enterprise, data center, and wireless markets.

The computing segment provides timing products, PCI Express switching and bridging products, high-performance server memory interfaces, multi-port products, signal integrity products, and PC audio and video products. This segment's computing products are designed for desktop, notebook, sub-notebook, storage, and server applications.

The consumer segment provides products for digital TVs, smartphones, and gaming consoles through touch controllers, timing products, multi-port memory, audio, and power management devices.

== History ==
Logo as of 1998

IDT's first product was the first low-power, high-speed CMOS-based 6116 static random-access memory (SRAM) device, released in 1981, followed by the first CMOS FIFO introduced in 1982.

In 1993, IDT entered the PC clock market with a family of devices (CV104, CV105, CV107, and CV109) focusing on desktop computer platforms. IDT planned to expand its market by producing a suite of PC clock devices that serve next-generation notebook and desktop computing platforms.

In the early 2000s, IDT introduced its first embedded microprocessor, the RC32334. The RC32334 was the first in the family of embedded processors targeted to communication applications. A year later, IDT introduced the industry's first network search engine.

In 2003, IDT announced its entry into the PC clock market. The company shifted its initial PC clock family to products serving current-generation desktop, notebook, and server platforms.

In 2004, IDT continued to expand its business by acquiring ZettaCom and Internet Machines Corporation, allowing IDT to enter the serial switching industry. Rather than continue to evolve ZettaCom's full line of existing physical-layer switching and traffic management chips, IDT converted ZettaCom's operation into a new serial switching division. With the acquisition of Internet Machines, IDT was able to accelerate its entry into the standards-based serial-switching market with the addition of PCI Express technology licensed from Internet Machines.

By the mid-2000s, IDT had developed a single-chip clocking device for notebook utilizing the Intel Centrino platform, a jitter attenuator for PCI Express applications, and a PCI Express interconnect to manage all communications in high density blade systems.

In July 2009, IDT and Micron Technology entered an alliance to develop PCI Express Solid-State Drive technologies for the server, storage and embedded markets. During this alliance, IDT and Micron co-developed enterprise flash controllers with PCIe host interface optimized for Micron's flash devices and future generation RealSSD solid-state drives.

== Mergers and acquisitions ==
In 1999 (or 2002), IDT acquired Quality Semiconductor, a provider of high-performance logic and networking semiconductor products, in an all-stock deal.

In 2001, IDT acquired Newave Inc., a Chinese semiconductor firm, to accelerate its investment in the growing Asian semiconductor industry and telecommunications market. Newave became a subsidiary of IDT through a cash-for-stock merger.

In April 2001, IDT acquired Solidum Systems, an Ottawa-based fabless semiconductor company.

In April 2004, IDT acquired ZettaCom, a serial switching and bridging semiconductor company, for $35 million. This enabled IDT to be one of the few communications IC suppliers to participate in the standards-based Advance Switching initiative spearheaded by Intel.

IDT made two acquisitions in 2005. In June, IDT acquired Integrated Circuit Systems (ICS) for about $1.7 billion in cash and stock. The acquisition provided a platform for growth within the communications, computing, and consumer market. In October, IDT acquired Freescale Semiconductor's timing products business for $35 million. The transaction was originally initiated by Integrated Circuit System Inc. before it was acquired by IDT earlier that year.

In July 2006, IDT acquired the PC Audio division of Austin-based company SigmaTel for $80 million. This included SigmaTel's designs, marketing and manufacturing rights for its products, and software drivers. IDT planned to maintain the production flow of the existing SigmaTel products as part of the purchase agreement. This division was later spun-off from IDT and became Tempo Semiconductor, Inc. in 2013.

In October 2008, IDT purchased the video processing technology and related assets from Silicon Optix, including the Hollywood Quality Video (HQV) brand and the Reon product line. This transaction included members of the Silicon Optix HQV engineering teams to enable continued delivery of video processing products.

In April 2009, IDT sold its network search engine business to NetLogic Microsystems for approximately $100 million.

In June 2009, IDT acquired the touch sensor technology assets and employees of Leadis Technology necessary to execute the existing roadmap. That same month, IDT acquired Tundra Semiconductor for about CDN $120.8 million to expand IDT's serial switching bridging products through PCI Express, RapidIO, and VME interconnect standards.

In 2010, IDT made two acquisitions. In January, IDT acquired Mobius Microsystems Inc., a developer of all-silicon oscillator technology. Terms of the deal were not disclosed. In late April of that year, IDT acquired the assets of IKOR, a former subsidiary of iWatt Corporation that manufactures power module VRM products for high-performance computing. The all-cash transaction allowed IDT to produce high-performance power management products for enterprise computing.

In September 2011, IDT and Qualcomm announced the signing of an agreement to transfer IDT's Hollywood Quality Video (HQV) and Frame Rate Conversion (FRC) Video Processing product lines and certain related assets to Qualcomm. As part of the agreement, both companies will be exploring options to include more of IDT's products in Qualcomm's reference designs.

In 2012, IDT made three acquisitions. In April, IDT acquired FOX Electronics, a global supplier of frequency control products (FCPs), in an all-cash transaction for approximately $30 million. In July 2012, IDT acquired NXP’s high-speed data converter assets and Alvand Technologies, an analog IP company specializing in data converters. Terms of the deals were not disclosed. These transactions add to IDT's for wireless infrastructure products.

In 2015, IDT acquired ZMDI in Dresden, Germany, for $307 million.

In 2017, IDT acquired GigPeak, a highly regarded optical interconnect product and technology business, for total cash consideration of $3.08 per share, or approximately $250 million in cash.

In September 2018, Renesas announced its acquisition of IDT for $6.7 billion. On March 30, 2019, Renesas completed the acquisition of Integrated Device Technology with the new division named Tempo Semiconductor.

== See also ==
- Centaur Technology: defunct former subsidiary that used to produce x86 CPUs under the IDT WinChip brand. Bought by VIA Technologies.
