= NetLogic Microsystems =

Semiconductor company

NetLogic Microsystems, Inc.
- Type: Subsidiary
- Traded as: Nasdaq: NETL
- Industry: Semiconductors; Electronics
- Founded: 1 January 1995
- Headquarters: United States
- Parent: Broadcom
- Website: netlogicmicro.com at the Wayback Machine (archived 2011-02-02)

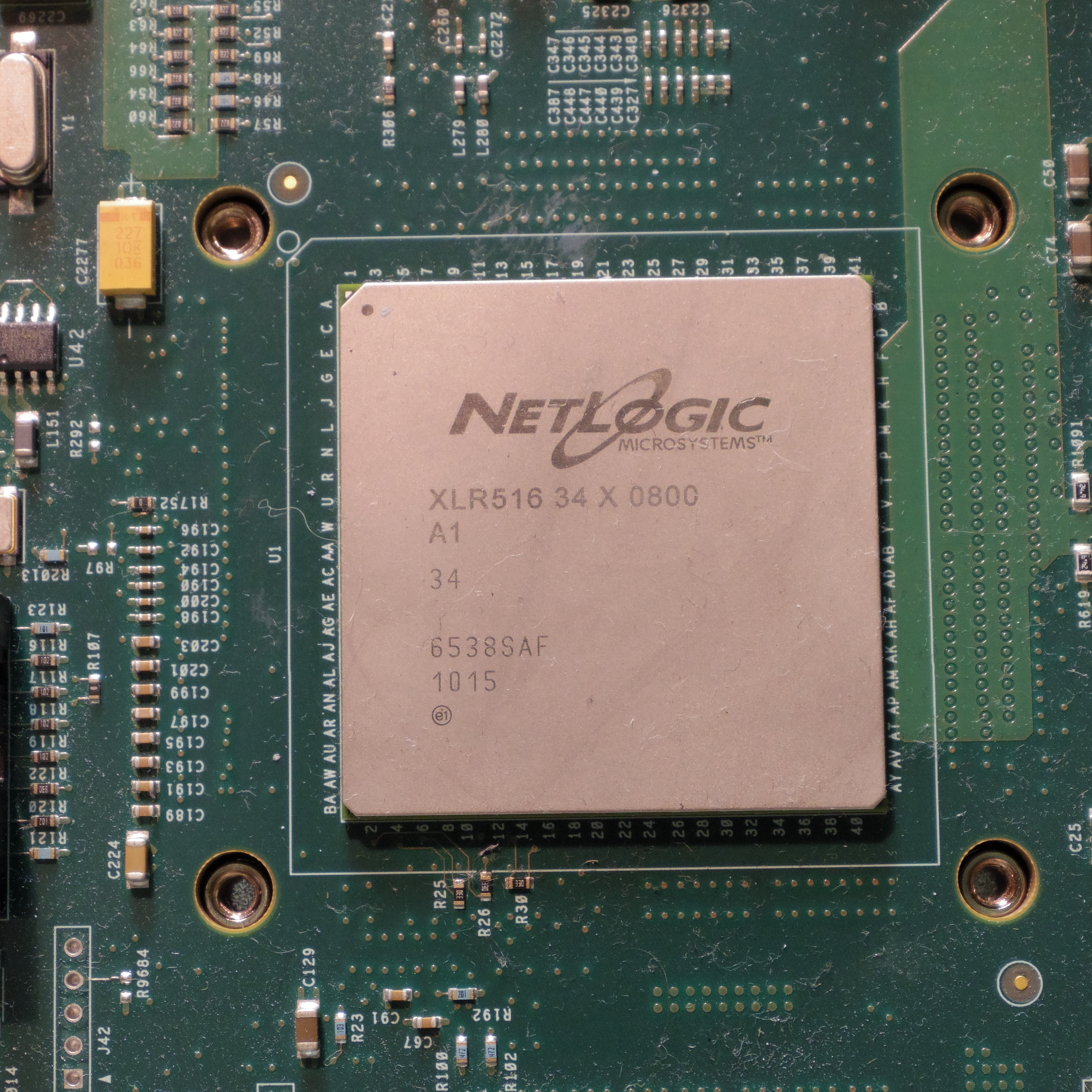
Integrated circuit XLR516, designed by NetLogic

NetLogic Microsystems, Inc. was a fabless semiconductor company that developed high performance products for data center, enterprise, wireless and wireline infrastructure networks. The company was founded in 1995 by Norman Godinho and Varad Srinivasan, became a public company on the NASDAQ exchange (ticker symbol: NETL) under the leadership of CEO Ronald Jankov in July 2004 and was acquired by Broadcom Corporation for $3.7 billion in February 2012.

== Products ==
NetLogic’s product portfolio included knowledge-based processors, multi-core processors, content processors, network search engines, high-speed 10 and 40 Gigabit Ethernet PHYs, wireless base station digital front-end PHYs and low-power embedded processors. Its global customer base included Alcatel-Lucent, Cisco Systems, Dell, Ericsson, Google, Hewlett-Packard, Huawei Technologies, Juniper Networks and Nokia-Siemens.

== History ==
It was in October 2007 that NetLogic Microsystems, Inc. signed a definitive agreement to acquire the privately held Aeluros, Inc., which created interface technologies and semiconductor products. In December 2010 NetLogic began using an implementation system developed by Magma Design Automation Inc, which created chip design software.

In 2011, NetLogic acquired Optichron for $22 million. From its IPO in 2004 through 2011, NetLogic grew at an annual rate of 39%, which was four to five times the average growth rate of semiconductor companies during that period. The company also enjoyed healthy profits, with gross profits in excess of 70% and net income in excess of 25% in 2011. NetLogic was one of the semiconductor industry's most innovative companies, having been granted more than 800 patents. The Global Semiconductor Alliance named NetLogic the Most Respected Emerging Public Semiconductor Company for three consecutive years, from 2009 to 2011.

On September 12, 2011, Broadcom Corporation agreed to buy NetLogic for $3.7 billion in cash. It was a 57% premium to NetLogic's closing price on September 9, 2011. NetLogic shareholders received $50 a share. It was Broadcom’s largest acquisition and its first acquisition of a publicly traded company. The acquisition closed in February 2012. According to the publication SlashGear, Broadcom hoped to boost its chipset division with the acquisition of NetLogic.

NetLogic was headquartered in Santa Clara, California, hired approximately 800 employees worldwide, and reported revenue of $405.4 million for its fiscal year 2012, its last fiscal year as a standalone company.
