= Software-defined =

Software-defined may refer to:

- GNSS software-defined receiver
- Software-defined data center
- Software-defined infrastructure
- Software-defined mobile network
- Software-defined networking
- Software-defined perimeter
- Software-defined protection
- Software-defined radio
  - List of software-defined radios
- Software-defined storage
