= Telecommunications network =

Network for communications over distance

A telecommunications network is a group of nodes interconnected by telecommunications links that are used to exchange messages between the nodes. The links may use a variety of technologies based on the methodologies of circuit switching, message switching, or packet switching to pass messages and signals.

Multiple nodes may cooperate to pass a message from an originating node to a destination node via multiple network hops. For this routing function, each node in the network is assigned a network address for identification and locating it on the network. The collection of addresses in the network is called the address space of the network.

Examples of telecommunications networks include computer networks, the Internet, the public switched telephone network (PSTN), the global Telex network, the aeronautical ACARS network, and the wireless radio networks of cell phone telecommunication providers.

== Network structure ==
This is the general structure of a network: every telecommunications network conceptually consists of three parts, or planes (so-called because they can be thought of as being and often are separate overlay networks):

- The data plane (also user plane, bearer plane, or forwarding plane) carries the network's users' traffic, the actual payload.
- The control plane carries control information (also known as signaling).
- The management plane carries the operations, administration and management traffic required for network management. The management plane is sometimes considered a part of the control plane.

== Data networks ==
Data networks are used extensively throughout the world for communication between individuals and organizations. Data networks can be connected to allow users seamless access to resources that are hosted outside of the particular provider they are connected to. The Internet is the best example of the internetworking of many data networks from different organizations.

Terminals attached to IP networks like the Internet are addressed using IP addresses. Protocols of the Internet protocol suite (TCP/IP) provide the control and routing of messages across the IP data network. There are many different network structures that IP can be used across to efficiently route messages, for example:

- Wide area networks (WAN)
- Metropolitan area networks (MAN)
- Local area networks (LAN)

There are three features that differentiate MANs from LANs or WANs:

1. The area of the network size is between LANs and WANs. The MAN will have a physical area between 5 and 50 km in diameter.
2. MANs do not generally belong to a single organization. The equipment that interconnects the network, the links, and the MAN itself are often owned by an association or a network provider that provides or leases the service to others.
3. A MAN is a means for sharing resources at high speeds within the network. It often provides connections to WAN networks for access to resources outside the scope of the MAN.

Data center networks also rely heavily on TCP/IP for communication across machines. They connect thousands of servers, are designed to be highly robust, and provide low latency and high bandwidth. Data center network topology plays a significant role in determining the level of failure resiliency, ease of incremental expansion, communication bandwidth and latency.

== Capacity and speed ==
In analogy to the improvements in the speed and capacity of digital computers, provided by advances in semiconductor technology and expressed in the bi-yearly doubling of transistor density, which is described empirically by Moore's law, the capacity and speed of telecommunications networks have followed similar advances, for similar reasons. In telecommunications, this is expressed in Edholm's law, proposed by and named after Phil Edholm in 2004. This empirical law holds that the bandwidth of telecommunication networks doubles every 18 months, which has proven to be true since the 1970s. The trend is evident in the Internet, cellular (mobile), wireless and wired local area networks (LANs), and personal area networks. This development is the consequence of rapid advances in the development of metal-oxide-semiconductor technology.

== See also ==
- Transcoder free operation
