= Clean Slate =

Clean Slate may refer to:

- Clean Slate (1994 film)
- Clean Slate (TV series)
- "Clean Slate" (Kim Possible), television episode
- Clean Slate Program, Stanford University research program
- Coup de Torchon (Clean Slate), French film

== See also ==
- Criminal Records (Clean Slate) Act 2004, New Zealand law
- Clean Slate Act (New York)
- Blank slate, a philosophical theory of the mind
