= Frenetic (programming language) =

- Paradigm: Domain-specific (software-defined networking), reactive, modular
- Typing discipline: Dynamic
- Website: www.frenetic-lang.org

Influenced by
- OCaml

Frenetic is a domain-specific language for programming software-defined networking (SDN). This domain-specific programming language allows network operators, rather than manually configuring each connected network device, to program the network as a whole. Frenetic is designed to solve major OpenFlow/NOX programming problems. In particular, Frenetic introduces a set of purely functional abstractions that enable modular program development, defines high-level, programmer-centric packet-processing operators, and eliminates many of the difficulties of the two-tier programming model by introducing a see-every-packet programming paradigm. Hence Frenetic is a functional reactive programming language operating at a packet level of abstraction.
