= NVP (disambiguation) =

Network Voice Protocol is a computer network protocol.

NVP may also refer to:

- Name–value pair, data representation in computer systems
- Naphthylvinylpyridine, an acetylcholine antagonist
- National Vigilance Park, Fort Meade, Maryland, United States
- Nationale Volkspartei (National People's Party), a far-right political party in Austria
- Nausea and vomiting of pregnancy
- Network virtualization platform
- Nevirapine, an antiretroviral drug
- Nonviolent Communication, an approach to communication based on principles of nonviolence
- N-version programming
- Nickelodeon Valuable Player, an award given on American TV program NFL Slimetime
- Nominal velocity of propagation, the speed with which electrical signals travels through various types of conductors; see velocity factor
