= Xara (disambiguation) =

Xara may refer to:

- Xara, a main character in Minecraft Story Mode Season 2
- Xara, a UK-based software company
- XARA, the abbreviation of Unauthorized Cross-App Resource Access a category of software exploits

== See also ==
- Khara inc., a Japanese anime production company
