= Martin Casado =

American software engineer and investor

Martín Casado
- Born: 1975 or 1976 (age 49–50); Cartagena, Spain
- Education: Northern Arizona University (Bachelor's); Stanford University (Masters, Ph.D.)
- Occupations: Andreessen Horowitz, General Partner

Martín Casado is an American software engineer, entrepreneur, and investor. He is a general partner at Andreessen Horowitz, was a pioneer of software-defined networking, and was a co-founder and the chief technology officer of Nicira Networks.

== Early life and education ==
Martín Casado was born around 1976 in Cartagena, Spain. He received his bachelor's degree from Northern Arizona University in 2000. In 2017, he received an honorary doctorate from the same university. Casado was a researcher at Lawrence Livermore National Laboratory from 1998 until 2003. While at LLNL, he ran large-scale computer simulations for the United States Department of Defense.

Casado attended Stanford University, earning both his Masters and PhD in computer science in 2007. While at Stanford, he began the development of OpenFlow, an open-source protocol that enabled software-defined networking. His Ph.D. thesis, "Architectural Support for Security Management in Enterprise Networks,” under advisors Nick McKeown, Scott Shenker and Dan Boneh, was published in 2008.

== Career ==
In 2007, Casado co-founded Nicira Networks along with McKeown and Shenker, a Palo Alto, California based company working on network virtualization. Casado also served as Nicira's chief technology officer.

Along with McKeown and Shenker, Casado promoted software-defined networking. His Ph.D. work at Stanford University led to the development of the OpenFlow protocol, which was promoting using the term software-defined networking (SDN). McKeown and Shenker co-founded the Open Networking Foundation (ONF) in 2011 to transfer control of OpenFlow to a not-for-profit organization.

In July 2012, VMware acquired Nicira for $1.26 billion. At VMware he was made a fellow and held the positions chief technology officer (CTO) for networking and security and general manager of the Networking and Security Business Unit.

Casado left VMware and joined venture capital firm Andreessen Horowitz in February 2016 as its ninth general partner. Andreessen Horowitz had been one of the investors in Nicira, contributing $17.7 million to the start-up venture.

== Awards ==
- Association for Computing Machinery (ACM) Grace Murray Hopper Award (2012)
