= GTSM =

GTSM may refer to:

- The Generalized TTL security mechanism, a proposed Internet data transfer security method.
- The Gre Tai Securities Market, a foundation serving the OTC market in Taiwan.
