= Urs Hölzle =

Swiss-American computer scientist

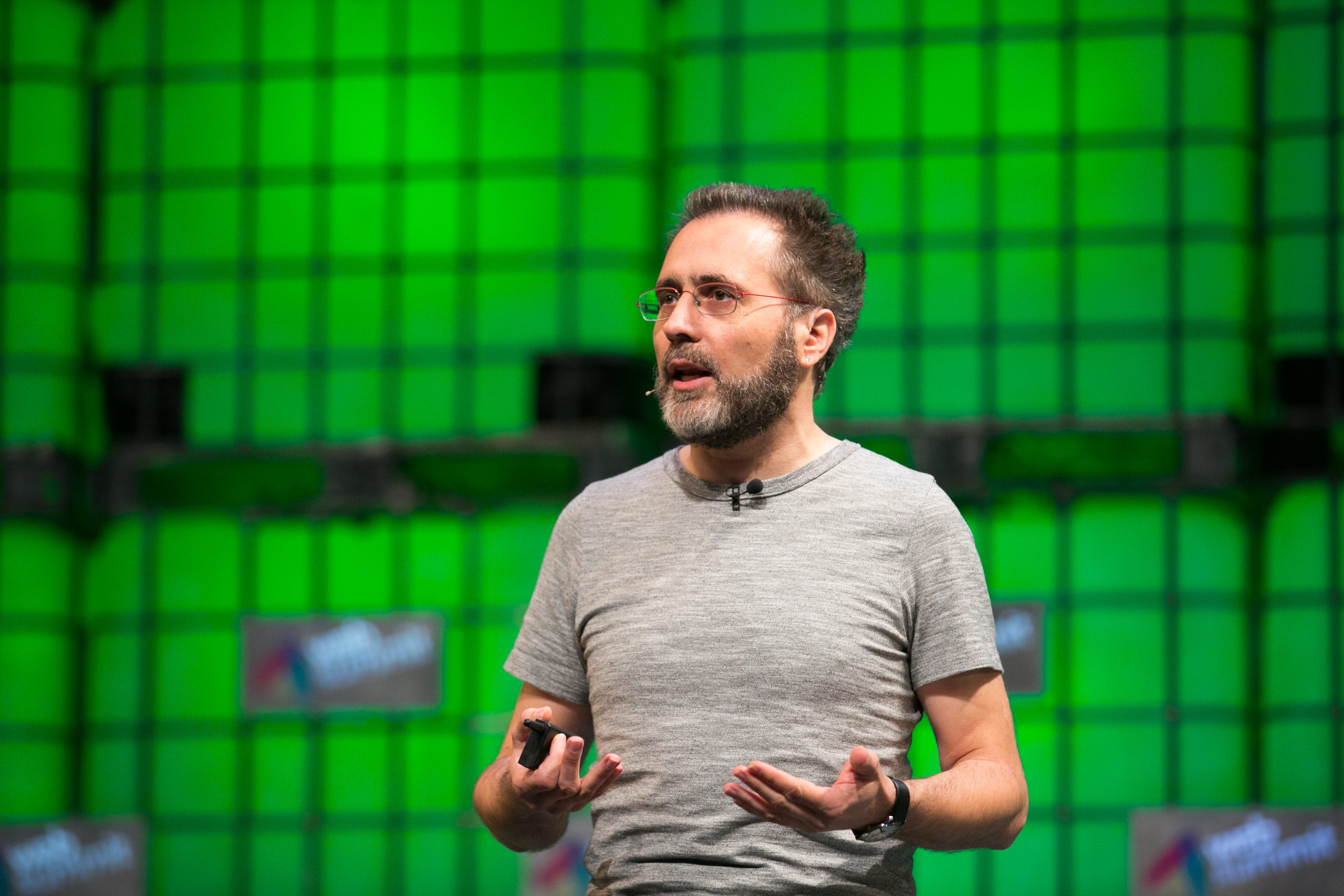
- Urs Hölzle (2014)
- Born: 1964 (age 61–62); Liestal, Switzerland
- Education: ETH Zurich; Stanford University
- Known for: JIT compilers, data centers, cloud computing, Google Cloud Platform
- Awards: AAAS Fellow, ACM Fellow, Fulbright Scholar, NAE Member
- Scientific career
- Workplaces: University of California, Santa Barbara; Google
- Thesis: Adaptive optimization for Self: Reconciling High Performance with Exploratory Programming (1994)
- Doctoral advisor: David Ungar; John L. Hennessy

Urs Hölzle (German pronunciation: [ˈʊrs ˈhœltslɛ]; born 1964) is a Swiss-American software engineer and technology executive. As Google's eighth employee and its first VP of Engineering, he has shaped much of Google's development processes and infrastructure, as well as its engineering culture. His most notable contributions include leading the development of fundamental cloud infrastructure such as energy-efficient data centers, distributed compute and storage systems, and software-defined networking. Until July 2023, he was the Senior Vice President of Technical Infrastructure and Google Fellow at Google. In July 2023, he transitioned to being a Google Fellow only.

== Career ==
Before joining Google, Hölzle was an associate professor of computer science at University of California, Santa Barbara. He received a master's degree in computer science from ETH Zurich in 1988 and was awarded a Fulbright scholarship that same year. In 1994, he earned a Ph.D. from Stanford University, where his research focused on programming languages and their efficient implementation. Via a startup founded by Hölzle, David Griswold, and Lars Bak (see Strongtalk), that work then evolved into a high-performance Java VM named HotSpot, acquired by Sun's JavaSoft unit in 1997 and from there became Sun's premier JVM implementation.

In 1999 he joined Google and became its first Vice President of Engineering later that year and influenced Google's corporate and engineering culture. While he led various areas during the early years of the company, including operations, search, and Gmail, he is best known for his work leading the infrastructure systems underpinning Google's applications, and for their focus on both efficiency and scalability. With Jeff Dean and Luiz Barroso he designed the initial distributed architecture for Google. This work was recognized by the Association for Computing Machinery who named him a Fellow for the design, engineering and operation of energy efficient large-scale cloud computing systems. He is also credited for creating Google Gulp for April Fool's Day in 2005.

=== Data centers and servers ===
He led the design of Google's efficient data centers which are said to use less than half the power of a conventional data center. In 2014 he received The Economist's Innovation Award for his datacenter efficiency work. With Luiz Barroso, he wrote The Datacenter as a Computer: An Introduction to the Design of Warehouse-Scale Machines. Now in its third edition, the book is the most downloaded textbook at Morgan Claypool and is widely used in undergraduate and graduate Computer Science education. For his contributions to the design, operation, and energy efficiency of large-scale data centers, Hölzle was elected into the National Academy of Engineering in 2013.

In June 2007, he introduced the Climate Savers Computing Initiative together with Pat Gelsinger which aimed to halve the power consumption of desktop computers and servers. In 2012, after mobile computing and enhanced awareness of datacenter energy costs had contributed to significant improvements in energy efficiency, CSCI merged with the Green Grid consortium.

Also in 2007, he and Luiz Barroso wrote "The Case for Energy Proportional Computing" which argued that servers should be designed to use power in proportion to their current load, because they spend much of their time being only partially loaded. This paper is often credited for spurring CPU manufacturers to make their designs much more energy efficient. Today, energy proportional computing has become a standard goal for both server and mobile uses.

=== Networking ===
Starting in 2005, Hölzle's team began to develop datacenter networking hardware because off-the-shelf network equipment could not scale to the demands of large data centers. Using Clos network topologies based on commodity switch chips, these datacenter networks scaled from an initial 10 Tbit/s to 1,000 Tbit/s a decade later. Initially esoteric and kept a secret, today this approach is standard for large datacenter networks; virtually all hyperscale datacenter operators use similar approaches.

In 2012, Hölzle introduced "the G-Scale Network" on which Google had begun managing its petabyte-scale internal data flow via OpenFlow, an open source software system jointly devised by scientists at Stanford and the UC Berkeley and promoted by the Open Networking Foundation. In 2021, this work was recognized by the ACM SIGCOMM Networking Systems Award. The internal data flow, or network, is distinct from the one that connects users to Google services (Search, Gmail, YouTube, etc.). In the process of describing the new network, Hölzle also confirmed more about Google's making of its own networking equipment like routers and switches for G-Scale; and said the company wanted, by being open about the changes, to "encourage the industry — hardware, software and ISP's — to look down this path and say, 'I can benefit from this.'" He said network utilization was nearing 100% of capacity, a dramatic efficiency improvement.

Google's teams also heavily contributed to software-defined networking, creating or contributing to key building blocks used in many networks today, including OpenConfig for vendor-neutral, model-driven network management; gRPC for fast RPCs, protobuf for data interchange, OpenTelemetry for tracing, and the Istio service mesh.

=== Cloud computing ===
Hölzle is credited with leading the creation of Google's internal cloud, including architecting clusters based on commodity servers, distributed file systems, cluster scheduling, software defined networking, hardware reliability, processor design, custom ASICs for AI (TPUs) and video processing, and many more. One of the most notable events from this period was the emergence of Kubernetes, a project funded by Hölzle.

Google's internal cloud doesn't use virtualization, but product development on an external cloud platform started in 2014, leading to the launch of the Google Cloud Platform in 2016. Hölzle is also credited with changing Google Cloud's engineering culture "to make the transition from niche cloud to enterprise class cloud".

=== Environmental work ===
In 2007, Hölzle announced that Google would be carbon neutral starting that year, using individually selected and monitored carbon offset projects. In the same year, Google started the RE<C initiative ("Renewable Energy less than (cheaper than) coal") to develop cheaper forms of renewable energy, but four years later Hölzle announced the end of that strategy, dropping development of "solar thermal" electricity (for example with BrightSource Energy) because it was not keeping pace with the rapid price decline of another solar technology – photovoltaics.

Starting in 2010, Google began buying renewable energy from new wind and solar farms to cover the energy needs for all its datacenters. In 2017, Hölzle received the CK Prahalad Award "for bringing about innovations and radical efficiencies in data center technology and increasing corporate purchasing of renewable energy" and for "not only accelerating Google’s sustainability, [but] also cutting a path for other companies to follow suit.” While purchases initially were small, they created a market for corporate renewable energy purchases that has become very influential in driving the overall growth of renewable energy purchases. For example, SP Global reports that the top hyperscalers (Amazon, Google, Meta, Microsoft) accounted for over 40% of contracted capacity during 2017-22.

In 2017 Google reached enough renewable energy to offset 100% of its usage and now is the world's largest corporate buyer of renewable energy. After reaching 100% renewables at an annual average level, Google has pursued an additional focus on 24/7 carbon free energy, i.e., actually running on 100% renewable energy every hour of every day. As of 2022, seven Google datacenter regions reached 90% or more carbon-free energy, and thirteen reached more than 85%. Hölzle has widely been credited for favoring market based approaches, discouraging proprietary paths that would only benefit Google. As a result, organizations like the Clean Energy Buyers Alliance, the European 24/7 CFE Hub, and the United Nations 24/7 Carbon-Free Energy Compact now focus on enabling any company to pursue their own carbon-free energy goals.

In 2022, Hölzle was revealed as the primary investor behind the New Zealand based solar developer Helios which aims to build about 10 grid-connected solar farms across New Zealand.

He is a board member of the US World Wildlife Fund.

=== Academic honors ===
Hölzle became a Fulbright scholar in 1988 and was elected a member of the National Academy of Engineering in 2013 for contributions to the design, operation, and energy efficiency of large-scale data centers. He also is a Fellow of the Association for Computing Machinery (2009), the AAAS (2017), and the Swiss Academies of Arts and Sciences.

== Google culture ==
As Google's eighth employee and its first VP of Engineering, Hölzle shaped much of Google's development processes and infrastructure. In a book about the early days of Google, Doug Edwards credits him with defining much of Google's engineering and corporate culture. For example, he is said to have instituted Google's practice of code reviews for every change, the culture of using blameless postmortems to learn from mistakes rather than find out whose fault it was, and a focus on using technical interviews to identify the best candidates. He recruited many of Google's early engineers, including Jeff Dean.

He was known for his self-deprecating humor; for example, his initial job title was Search Engine Mechanic "because everything was broken".

Hölzle also influenced Google's office culture by bringing his dog Yoshka to work. In 2004 Yoshka even "authored" a blog post, and today Google declares itself a "dog company". The cafe in Building 43 of the Googleplex is named Yoshka's Cafe in honor of Google's first dog.

In July 2021 he was criticized for a perceived 'hypocritical' approach to remote working; opposing it strongly for others, while relocating to New Zealand. However, shortly after Hölzle's transfer was announced, Google approved the large majority of employee applications, permitting 8,500 other employees to work remotely as well.
