= Clean Slate Program =

Interdisciplinary research program

The Clean Slate Program was an interdisciplinary research program at Stanford University which considered how the Internet could be redesigned with a "clean slate", without the accumulated complexity of existing systems but using the experience gained in their decades of development. Its program director was Nick McKeown.

== Program outline ==
Clean Slate was based on the belief that the current Internet has significant deficiencies that need to be solved before it can become a unified global communication infrastructure, and that the Internet's shortcomings will not be resolved by the conventional incremental and backward-compatible style of academic and industrial networking research.

The research program focused on unconventional, bold, and long-term research that tries to break the network's ossification. To this end, the program was characterized by two research questions:

- "With what we know today, if we were to start again with a clean slate, how would we design a global communications infrastructure?"
- "How should the Internet look in upcoming 15 years?"

Program coordinators identified five key areas for research:

1. Network architecture
2. Heterogeneous applications
3. Heterogeneous physical-layer technologies
4. Security
5. Economics and policy

The Clean Slate Program ceased in January 2012, after spawning four major follow-up projects:

1. Internet Infrastructure: OpenFlow and Software Defined Networking
2. Mobile Internet: POMI 2020
3. Mobile Social Networking: MobiSocial
4. Data Center: Stanford Experimental Data Center Lab
