= Nick McKeown =

British technology researcher

Nicholas William McKeown FREng (born April 7, 1963) is a professor in the Electrical Engineering and Computer Science departments at Stanford University, and a visiting professor at Oxford University. He has also started technology companies in Silicon Valley.

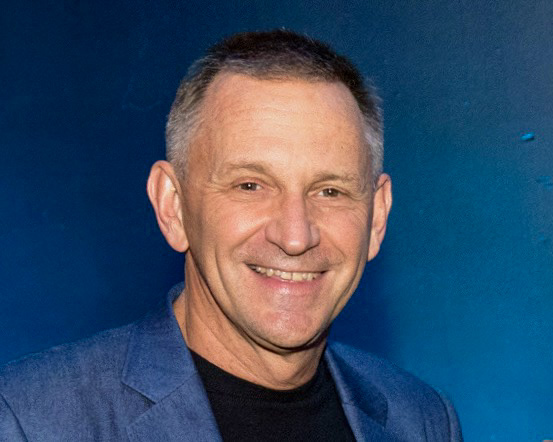

McKeown received his bachelor's degree from the University of Leeds in 1986. From 1986 through 1989 he worked for Hewlett-Packard Labs, in their network and communications research group in Bristol, England. He moved to the United States in 1989, and earned a master's degree in 1992 and PhD in 1995 both from the University of California at Berkeley. During spring 1995, he worked briefly for Cisco Systems where he helped architect their GSR 12000 router. His PhD thesis was on "Scheduling Cells in an Input-Queued Cell Switch", with advisor Professor Jean Walrand. He joined the faculty of Stanford University in 1995 as assistant professor of electrical engineering and computer science. In 1997, McKeown co-founded Abrizio Inc. with Anders Swahn, where he was CTO. Abrizio was acquired by PMC-Sierra in 1999 for stock shares worth $400 million. He was promoted to associate professor in 2002. He was co-founder in 2003 (with Sundar Iyer) and CEO of Nemo Systems, which Cisco Systems bought in 2005. He became faculty director of the Clean Slate Program in 2006, and was promoted to full professor at Stanford in 2010. In 2007, Casado, McKeown and Shenker co-founded Nicira Networks, a Palo Alto, California-based company working on network virtualization, acquired by VMWare for $1.26 billion in July 2012.

== Research ==
McKeown is active in the software-defined networking (SDN) movement, which he helped start with Scott Shenker and Martin Casado. SDN and OpenFlow arose from the PhD work of Casado at Stanford University, where he was a student of McKeown. OpenFlow is a novel programmatic interface for controlling network switches, routers, WiFi access points, cellular base stations and WDM/TDM equipment. OpenFlow challenged the vertically integrated approach to switch and router design of the past twenty years. In 2011, McKeown and Shenker co-founded the Open Networking Foundation (ONF) to transfer control of OpenFlow to a newly created not-for-profit organization.

McKeown promoted the idea that network switches should be programmable rather than fixed. A collaboration between TI and Stanford, led to the PISA (protocol independent switch architecture), published originally under the name RMT. The P4 language was created to specify how packets should be processed in programmable switches. P4 is an open-source language maintained by P4.org, a non-profit McKeown founded with Jennifer Rexford and Amin Vahdat. McKeown co-founded Barefoot Networks to build and sell PISA switches, to demonstrate that programmable switches can be built at the same power, performance and cost as fixed-function switches. In June 2019, Intel Corporation announced its intent to acquire Barefoot Networks to support their focus on end-to-end networking and infrastructure leadership for their data center customers. Nick joined Intel and became the SVP/GM of the Network and Edge Group (NEX) when it was formed in 2021.

== Awards and distinctions ==
In 2000, the Institute of Electrical and Electronics Engineers (IEEE) Communications Society Stephen O. Rice Prize for the best paper in communications theory went to a paper on "Achieving 100% Throughput in an Input-Queued Switch", which McKeown co-authored with Adisak Mekkittikul, Venkat Anantharam and Jean Walrand. The paper discussed dealing with the problem of head-of-line blocking using virtual output queues.

McKeown holds an honorary doctorate from ETH Zurich. He is a Distinguished Alumnus of Electrical Engineering at University of California, Berkeley. In 2012, McKeown received the ACM Sigcomm "Lifetime Achievement" Award "for contributions to the design, analysis, and engineering of high-performance routers, resulting in a major impact on the global Internet". McKeown is a member of the National Academy of Engineering, the American Academy of Arts and Sciences (AAAS), and the National Academy of Inventors. He is a Fellow of the Royal Academy of Engineering (UK), a Fellow of the IEEE and the Association for Computing Machinery (ACM). In 2005, he was awarded the Lovelace Medal from the British Computer Society where he gave a lecture on "Internet Routers (Past Present and Future)". The citation described him as "the world's leading expert on router design." In 2009, he received the IEEE Koji Kobayashi Computers and Communications Award. In 2015 he shared the NEC C&C Award with Martin Casado and Scott Shenker for their work on SDN. In 2021, McKeown was awarded the IEEE Alexander Graham Bell Medal for exceptional contributions to communications and networking sciences and engineering. McKeown was awarded the 2025 Marconi Prize. At Stanford he has been the STMicroelectronics Faculty Scholar, the Robert Noyce Faculty Fellow, a Fellow of the Powell Foundation and the Alfred P. Sloan Foundation, and recipient of a CAREER award from the National Science Foundation.

Vint Cerf and McKeown created two entertaining videos to introduce Cerf at conferences (Video 1 and Video 2). McKeown performed at the TED 2006 Conference in Monterey, where he took the stage to juggle while reciting Pi. McKeown was an international swimmer and competed for Great Britain in the 1985 World Student Games in Kobe, where he swam 100m breaststroke.

== Opposition to the death penalty ==
McKeown is involved in the movement to abolish the death penalty, including leadership roles in unsuccessful 2012 and 2016 California ballot initiatives to end capital punishment, which ultimately led to a moratorium put in place by Governor Gavin Newsom on March 13, 2019. In 2001, he co-funded the Death Penalty Clinic at the UC Berkeley School of Law in Berkeley, California. In 2009, he received the Abolition Award from Death Penalty Focus. He gave a TedX talk about abolition in 2016.
