= Clean Slate Act =

Clean Slate Act may refer to:

- Criminal Records (Clean Slate) Act 2004, a 2004 law in New Zealand allowing certain criminal records to be made inaccessible to the public after several years.
- Clean Slate Act (New York), a similar 2024 law in New York State.
