= ONF =

ONF may refer to:

- ONF (band), a South Korean boy band
- Official National Front, a defunct political party in the United Kingdom
- Office national des forêts, the French national forest agency
- Ocala National Forest, in Florida
- Old Northern French, another name for the Old Norman dialect
- Open Networking Foundation, a nonprofit trade organization
- All-Russia People's Front (Obshcherossiyskiy narodnyy front), a political organization
- The National Film Board of Canada, Office national du film du Canada in French, a public organization
