= Barefoot Networks =

American computer networking company

- Company type: Division
- Industry: Networking software, cloud networking
- Founded: May 2013
- Founders: Nick McKeown, Pat Bosshart
- Defunct: 2019
- Fate: Acquired by Intel in 2019
- Headquarters: Santa Clara, California, USA
- Products: Programmable networking chips, systems and software
- Parent: Intel
- Website: barefootnetworks.com

Barefoot Networks is a computer networking company headquartered in Santa Clara, California. The company designs and produces programmable network switch silicon, systems and software. The company was acquired by Intel in 2019.

== Background ==
Barefoot Networks was founded in 2013. The company is backed by Andreessen Horowitz, Lightspeed Venture Partners and Sequoia Capital. The company's co-founders are Nick McKeown, Martin Izzard, Pat Bosshart, and Stefanos Sidiropoulos. Dan Lenoski joined in 2014 and was also given co-founder status. The company came out of stealth mode on June 14, 2016. The company also announced a third round led by Goldman Sachs, AT&T, Dell, and Google. Later in 2016, the company announced additional funding from Alibaba Group and Tencent. In 2017, Craig H. Barratt took over from Martin Izzard as CEO until May 2020.

In June 2019, Intel announced it was acquiring Barefoot for an undisclosed price.

In January 2023, Intel stated that it has halted production on its networking chips.

== Products ==
=== Barefoot Tofino ===
Barefoot Tofino is a P4-programmable switch chip that can run up to speeds of 12.8 Tbit/s.

=== Programmability ===
P4 is a programming language designed to allow programming of packet forwarding dataplanes.

=== Barefoot Deep Insight ===
Barefoot Deep Insight is a network monitoring system that provides full visibility into every packet in a network. Running on commodity servers, Barefoot Deep Insight interprets, analyzes and pinpoints a myriad of conditions that can impede packet flow, and does so in real time and at line-rate.
