= Larch Networks =

Larch Networks, Ltd.
- Company type: Privately Held
- Industry: Networking equipment
- Founded: 2008
- Headquarters: Rosh Ha'ayin, Israel
- Products: Networking Device; Network Management; Embedded system
- Website: larch-networks.com

Larch Network, Ltd. (previously Niram Systems) is company specializing in the design and development of hardware and software for embedded network systems, including network switches and routers, thin client systems and Linux gateways.

== Products and services ==
Larch Network is an exclusive developer of Ethernet switching solutions for selected Marvell customers.

=== L2/L3 Switches ===
Larch Networks products are supplied with complete reference designs, including board layouts, software, manufacturing diagnostic tools, documentation, and other resources to support customers in product evaluation and production.

=== Thin client / Plug PC ===
An Open Source Green Server for the Always-On Lifestyle

=== OpenFlow Switch ===
The Extendible Linux-based OpenFlow LN-2124OF switch based on Marvell 98DX4122 Packet-Processors and contains the implementation of hardware-based OpenFlow protocol 1.0 standard in OpenFlow-Only mode.

The benefits of this product are:

- An introduction of new and utilization of existent hardware capabilities of Marvell Packet-Processors
- Acceleration of the development of new features per a customer’s demand
- Easy-to-use SDK platform for Marvell’s Packet-Processors product line
- Providing universities (professors and students) the powerful platform for study and academic researches.

The underlying hardware is capable of many functions not supported by OpenFlow v1.0 including:

- Multiple Lookup cycles
- Extensible Matching
- Tunneling QoS and Security
- Full VLAN support
- Bandwidth allocation and policing, etc.

The user can modify and extend the software functionality to utilize additional Hardware functionality not yet in use, implement a substantial subset of OpenFlow v1.3, or add additional application level functionality. In addition, LN2124OF Switch provides unique DualBoot system, that allows coexistence of two different OS in one switch – Linux Based open-source Operation System, and fully managed stacking Ethernet Switch based on Marvell's Routing Operation System (ROS), that contains full features set of Layer2 and Layer3 protocols and is the manufacturing default.

== See also ==
- Marvell
- Open Networking Foundation
