= Management interface =

In computing, a management interface is a network interface dedicated to configuration and management operations. Management interfaces are typically connected to dedicated out of band management networks (either VPNs or physical networks), and non-management interfaces are not allowed to carry device or network management traffic. This greatly reduces the attack surface of the managed devices, as external attackers cannot access management functions directly, and thus improves network security.

In some cases, serial ports are used to access the command line interface directly, avoiding transport over a generic network stack completely, providing a further layer of isolation from network attacks.

There are different types and protocols for Management Interfaces.

- Command-Line Interfaces (CLI) are the most pervasive management interfaces and are often proprietary.
- Transaction Language (TL-1) is a simple command and control language used primarily for network element management.
- Network Management Protocol Interfaces include multiple protocols such as: Simple Network Management Protocol (SNMP), Common Object Request Broker Architecture (CORBA), Extensible Markup Language (XML), Simple Object Protocol (SOAP).

The advantages and limitations often vary. There is some flexibility but at the same time it will highly depend on your usage.

== See also ==
- Management plane
