= List of SDN controller software =

Software-defined networking (SDN) is a marketing term which refers to software to configure and operate computer networks (especially data center networks) through a centralized software controller that dictates how the network behaves. The core of this new paradigm is the SDN controller.

There are typically two sets of SDN controllers:

- SDN controllers for the network function virtualization (NFV) of a datacenter,
- SDN controllers for managing the programmable switches of a network.

In case of SDN controllers for the NFV Infrastructure of a datacenter, they are mostly designed to provide some policy and centralized managements for the Openstack Neutron networking layer that will provide inter-working between the virtual ports created by Nova. The technology of SDN controllers is to manage the Linux kernel features made of L3 IP routing, Linux bridges, iptables or ebtables, network namespaces and Open vSwitch.

== Open and community-driven initiatives ==
Some promotional links to be removed:

- Beacon
- Faucet
- lighty-core
- Cherry
- NOX/POX
- ONOS
- Open vSwitch
- OpenDaylight (controller baseline project, upon which many other controllers are built)
- OpenKilda
- Project Calico
- Floodlight
- RUNOS
- Ryu Controller
- The Fast Data Project
- vneio/sdnc
- OpenSDN
- OVN
- Cilium

== Vendor Specific Initiatives ==
- lighty.io by PANTHEON.tech
- Nuage Virtualized Services Controller (VSC) by Nokia
- SEL-5056 by Schweitzer Engineering Laboratories
- VortiQa Open Network Director by Freescale Semiconductor
