= OpenDaylight Project =

Software development project

OpenDaylight
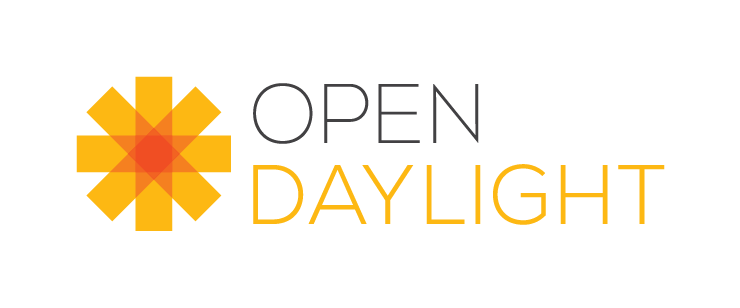
- Release: 5 February 2014; 12 years ago
- Stable release: 0.21.2 (Scandium-SR2) / 25 March 2025; 15 months ago
- Written in: Java
- License: Eclipse Public License 1.0
- Website: www.opendaylight.org
- Repository: git.opendaylight.org/gerrit/; github.com/opendaylight (mirror)

The OpenDaylight Project is a collaborative open-source project hosted by the Linux Foundation. The project serves as a platform for software-defined networking (SDN) for customizing, automating and monitoring computer networks of any size and scale.

== History ==
On April 8, 2013, The Linux Foundation announced the founding of the OpenDaylight Project. The goal was to create a community-led and industry-supported, open-source platform to accelerate adoption & innovation in terms of software-defined networking (SDN) and network functions virtualization (NFV). The project's founding members were Big Switch Networks, Brocade, Cisco, Citrix, Ericsson, IBM, Juniper Networks, Microsoft, NEC, Red Hat and VMware.

Reaction to the goals of open architecture and administration by The Linux Foundation have been mostly positive. While initial criticism centered on concerns that this group could be used by incumbent technology vendors to stifle innovation, most of the companies signed up as members do not sell incumbent networking technology.

=== Technical steering committee ===
For governance of the project, the technical steering committee (TSC) provides technical oversight over the project. The TSC is able to hold voting on major changes to the project. As of June 2022, the TSC includes:

- Anil Belur (The Linux Foundation)
- Cedric Ollivier (Orange)
- Guillaume Lambert (Orange)
- Ivan Hrasko (PANTHEON.tech)
- Luis Gomez (Kratos)
- Manoj Chokka (Verizon)
- Robert Varga (PANTHEON.tech)
- Venkatrangan Govindarajan (Rakuten Mobile)

OpenDaylight TSC Chairs List
Term Years	TSC Chair
2013, 2014	David Meyer
2015, 2016, 2017	Colin Dixon
2018, 2019, 2020	Abhijit Kumbhare
2021, 2022	Guillaume Lambert

=== Code Contributions ===
By 2015, user companies began participating in upstream development. The largest, actively contributing companies include PANTHEON.tech⁣, Orange, Red Hat, and Ericsson. At the time of the Carbon release in May 2017, the project estimated that over 1 billion subscribers accessing OpenDaylight-based networks, in addition to its usage within large enterprises.

There is a dedicated OpenDaylight Wiki, and mailing lists.

== Technology ==
=== Projects ===
The platform is described as a modular, open-source platform for automating networks. Part of the concept of modularity are over 50 projects, which address & extend the capabilities of networks managed by OpenDaylight. Each project has a formal structure, teams and meetings to discuss releases, functionality and code. Projects include BGPCEP, TransportPCE, NETCONF, YANG Tools, and others.

== Releases ==
Releases are named after the atomic number of chemical elements, including the corresponding number.

Release name	Release date
Scandium (21)	September 2024
Calcium (20)	April 2024
Potassium (19)	October 2023
Argon (18)	March 2023
Chlorine (17)	October 2022
Sulfur (16)	May 2022
Phosphorus (15)	September 2021
Silicon (14)	March 2021
Aluminium (13)	September 2020
Magnesium (12)	March 2020
Sodium (11)	September 2019
Neon (10)	March 2019
Fluorine (9)	August 2018
Oxygen (8)	March 2018
Nitrogen (7)	September 2017
Carbon (6)	June 2017
Boron (5)	November 2016
Beryllium (4)	February 2016
Lithium (3)	June 2015
Helium (2)	October 2014
Hydrogen (1)	February 2014

== Members ==
Originally there were three tiers of membership for OpenDaylight: Platinum, Gold and Silver, with varying levels of commitment.

As of January 2018, OpenDaylight became a project within the LF Networking Foundation, which consolidated membership across multiple projects into a common governance structure. Most OpenDaylight members became members of the new LF Networking Foundation.

== See also ==
- List of SDN controller software
- Apache Karaf
- YANG
