= East–west traffic =

Network traffic among devices within a data center

In computer networking, east–west traffic is network traffic among devices within a specific data center. The other direction of traffic flow is north–south traffic, data flowing from or to a system physically residing outside the data center.

== Traffic ==
As a result of virtualization, private cloud, converged, and hyper-converged infrastructure adoption, east-west traffic volumes have increased. Today many virtual functions, including virtual firewalls, load balancers and other software-defined networking (SDN), perform various functions and services that previously ran on physical hardware. As these components relay data to each other, they increase traffic on the network, which can increase latency and cause network congestion. As disaggregated compute and storage become popular, east-west traffic volumes will increase.

Traditionally, many data centers today deploy their systems using a fat-tree or Clos topology. In this network topology, servers and appliances that host applications are deployed within the racks. There is a top-of-rack (ToR) switch (a leaf switch) that connects the systems within the rack as well as to other spine switches. The spine switches connect ToRs as well as provide connectivity to other spine switches through another layer of switch.

Applications communicate with other applications running on other systems for typical services, such as accessing an asset stored in another device, gathering results from a micro-service task(s) executed on other systems, or simply getting a status update from management software.

== See also ==
- Virtual private network
