= Nicira =

Network virtualization company

Nicira is a company focused on software-defined networking (SDN) and network virtualization. Nicira created their own proprietary versions of the OpenFlow, Open vSwitch, and OpenStack networking projects.

Nicira was co-founded in 2007 by Martin Casado, Nick McKeown and Scott Shenker. Casado served as the company's CTO. On July 23, 2012, VMware announced they intended to acquire Nicira for $1.26 billion, a deal which closed the following month. Nicira technology was merged into VMware's vSwitch and rebranded with the name NSX.
