= Software-defined infrastructure =

Infrastructure management

Software-defined infrastructure (SDI) is an approach to managing and provisioning computing infrastructure, such as compute, storage, and networking, through software-based abstractions rather than direct interaction with physical hardware. It builds on virtualization and automation to enable infrastructure to be configured, deployed, and managed programmatically.

In cloud-based and software-defined environments, infrastructure is increasingly abstracted from underlying hardware, with greater emphasis on non-functional requirements such as performance and scalability. Despite this abstraction, system behavior remains dependent on the capabilities and limitations of the underlying physical resources.

== Embedded Systems ==
In embedded systems, software-defined principles are often realized through firmware based control of hardware devices. A single hardware platform may support multiple functions depending on the software or firmware it runs.

A common mechanism enabling this flexibility is over-the-air updates, which allow firmware to be updated remotely and wirelessly. This enables devices to be reconfigured, improved, or repurposed without requiring physical modification.

== See also ==
- Infrastructure as code (IaC) which manages and provisions computer data center resources
- Software-defined networking (SDN), which separates network control logic from hardware devices
- Software-defined storage (SDS), which abstracts storage resources into software-managed pools
- Software-defined radio (SDR), where radio signal processing is implemented in software rather than hardware circuits

Terms such as software-defined equipment (SDE) or software-defined apparatus (SDA) are sometimes used to describe hardware systems whose functionality is largely determined by software, though these terms are less standardized.
