= Transcoder free operation =

In a telecommunication network, transcoder free operation, or TrFO, also known as Out of band transcoder control, is the concept of removing transcoding function in a call path. In legacy GSM networks a call between two mobile stations involved two transcoding functions, one at each BSC. This transcoding functionality was generally implemented in a separate Transcoder and Rate Adaptation Unit, or TRAU. TRAU was connected to BSC and MSC through TDM E1 or STM-1.

With the introduction of NGN and 3G networks the Radio Network Controller was connected to MGW through ATM or IP instead of TDM. Therefore, this external transcoder was removed and transcoding function was moved up to the MGW. NGN also introduced Nb interface over IP such that it became possible to carry compressed voice codecs such as AMR in the Nb interface. In a call scenario such as this the transcoding functionality in the MGW could be eliminated such that voice quality can be improved and resources in MGW also could be saved. Concept of TrFO became applicable for 2G networks also with the "A interface over IP" implementation.
