= Virtual Distributed Ethernet =

Virtualised network infrastructure

Virtual Distributed Ethernet (VDE) is a set of programs to provide virtual software-defined Ethernet network interface controllers (NICs) across multiple devices, typically computers, which are either virtual or physical. It forms part of the Virtual Square project from the Italian Bologna University whose code is available on public servers using free software licenses, mostly GPLv2. Researchers at the Department of Mathematics and Computer Science, Xavier University, Cincinnati OH, US are also working on the project.

It is one of the available networking methods for the Linux Kernel-based Virtual Machine (KVM) and forms part of some Linux distributions such as Ubuntu Precise (12.04 LTS) and Debian

== Overview ==
Software-defined networking is the dynamic creation of virtual network infrastructure that is completely decoupled and independent of any physical network hardware.

== Structure ==
VDE (Virtual Distributed Ethernet) comprises 5 main components:

=== VDE switch ===
A virtual Ethernet switch is equivalent of a physical switch with multiple virtual ports supporting connections from VDE devices. Supports telnet and a web interface for monitoring and configuration.

=== VDE plug ===
Simulates a plug on the end of a physical Ethernet cable such as the 8P8C. It forms the connection point between the host and the virtual VDE wire.

=== VDE wire ===
Receives the data from a VDE plug and transports it to another VDE plug. Obviously performing the same function as the wires within normal Ethernet cabling.

=== VDE cable ===
The combination of 2 VDE plugs and 1 VDE wire is called a VDE cable.

=== VDE cryptcab ===
A connectionless protocol that encrypts the data before transmitting it and that decrypts the data on the other side. Informally known as VDE Encrypted Cable.
