= North–south traffic =

Denotes a direction of traffic flow into and out of a data center

In computer networking, north–south traffic is network traffic flowing into and out of a data center.

== Traffic ==
Based on the most commonly deployed network topology of systems within a data center, north–south traffic typically indicates data flow that either enters or leaves the data center from/to a system physically residing outside the data center, such as user to server.

Southbound traffic is data entering the data center (through a firewall and/or other networking infrastructure). Data exiting the data center is northbound traffic, commonly routed through a firewall to Internet space.

The other direction of traffic flow is east–west traffic which typically indicates data flow within a data center.

== See also ==
- Virtual private network
