= Software-defined networking =

Approach to network management

Software-defined networking (SDN) is an approach to network management that uses abstraction to enable dynamic and programmatically efficient network configuration to create grouping and segmentation while improving network performance and monitoring in a manner more akin to cloud computing than to traditional network management. SDN is meant to improve the static architecture of traditional networks and may be employed to centralize network intelligence in one network component by disassociating the forwarding process of network packets (data plane) from the routing process (control plane). The control plane consists of one or more controllers, which are considered the brains of the SDN network, where the whole intelligence is incorporated. However, centralization has certain drawbacks related to security, scalability and elasticity.

SDN was commonly associated with the OpenFlow protocol for remote communication with network plane elements to determine the path of network packets across network switches since OpenFlow's emergence in 2011. However, since 2012, proprietary systems have also used the term. These include Cisco Systems' Open Network Environment and Nicira's network virtualization platform.

SD-WAN applies similar technology to a wide area network (WAN).

In addition to WAN use cases, SDN is also increasingly applied in telecom backbones, where it is paired with operational inventory and automation platforms to provide real-time visibility, service assurance, and simplified provisioning across multi-vendor networks.

== History ==
The history of SDN principles can be traced back to the separation of the control and data planes first used in public switched telephone networks. This provided a manner of simplifying provisioning and management years before the architecture was used in data networks.

The Internet Engineering Task Force (IETF) began considering various ways to decouple the control and data forwarding functions in a proposed interface standard published in 2004 named Forwarding and Control Element Separation (ForCES). The ForCES Working Group also proposed a companion SoftRouter architecture. Additional early standards from the IETF that pursued separating control from data planes include the Linux Netlink as an IP services protocol, and a path computation element (PCE)-based architecture.

These early attempts failed to gain traction. One reason is that many in the Internet community viewed separating control from data to be risky, especially given the potential for failure in the control plane. Another reason is that vendors were concerned that creating standard application programming interfaces (APIs) between the control and data planes would result in increased competition.

In 2006 a young startup was founded around SDN style network topology and submitted a collection of SDN patents in 2007.

The use of open-source software in these separated architectures traces its roots to the Ethane project at Stanford's computer science department. Ethane's simple switch design led to the creation of OpenFlow, and an API for OpenFlow was first created in 2008. In that same year, NOX, an operating system for networks, was created.

SDN research included emulators such as vSDNEmul, EstiNet, and Mininet.

Work on OpenFlow continued at Stanford, including with the creation of testbeds to evaluate the use of the protocol in a single campus network, as well as across the WAN as a backbone for connecting multiple campuses. In academic settings, there were several research and production networks based on OpenFlow switches from NEC and Hewlett-Packard, as well as those based on Quanta Computer white-boxes starting in about 2009.

Beyond academia, the first deployments were by Nicira in 2010 to control OVS from Onix, codeveloped with NTT and Google. A notable deployment was Google's B4 in 2012. Later, Google announced the first OpenFlow/Onix deployments in its datacenters. Another large deployment exists at China Mobile.

The Open Networking Foundation was founded in 2011 to promote SDN and OpenFlow.

At the 2014 Interop and Tech Field Day, software-defined networking was demonstrated by Avaya using shortest-path bridging (IEEE 802.1aq) and OpenStack as an automated campus, extending automation from the data center to the end device and removing manual provisioning from service delivery.

== Concept ==
SDN architectures decouple network control (control plane) and forwarding (data plane) functions, enabling the network control to become directly programmable and the underlying infrastructure to be abstracted from applications and network services. The OpenFlow protocol is one of the protocols used in SDN technologies.

The SDN architecture is:

- Directly programmable: Network control is directly programmable because it is decoupled from forwarding functions.
- Agile: Abstracting control from forwarding lets administrators dynamically adjust network-wide traffic flow to meet changing needs.
- Centrally managed: Network intelligence is (logically) centralized in software-based SDN controllers that maintain a global view of the network, which appears to applications and policy engines as a single, logical switch.
- Programmatically configured: SDN lets network managers configure, manage, secure, and optimize network resources very quickly via dynamic, automated SDN programs, which they can write themselves because the programs do not depend on proprietary software.
- Open standards-based and vendor-neutral: When implemented through open standards, SDN simplifies network design and operation because instructions are provided by SDN controllers instead of multiple, vendor-specific devices and protocols.

== New network architecture ==
The explosion of mobile devices and content, server virtualization, and the advent of cloud services are among the trends driving the networking industry to re-examine traditional network architectures. Many conventional networks are hierarchical, built with tiers of Ethernet switches arranged in a tree structure. This design made sense when client-server computing was dominant, but such a static architecture may be ill-suited to the dynamic computing and storage needs of today's enterprise data centers, campuses, and carrier environments. Some of the key computing trends driving the need for a new network paradigm include:

Changing traffic patterns
Within the enterprise data center, traffic patterns have changed significantly. In contrast to client-server applications where the bulk of the communication occurs between one client and one server, today's applications access different databases and servers, creating a flurry of east-west machine-to-machine traffic before returning data to the end user device in the classic north-south traffic pattern. At the same time, users are changing network traffic patterns as they push for access to corporate content and applications from any type of device, connecting from anywhere, at any time. Finally, many enterprise data center managers are deploying a utility computing model, which may include a private cloud, public cloud, or some mix of both, resulting in additional traffic across the wide-area network.

The consumerization of IT
Users are increasingly employing mobile personal devices such as smartphones, tablets, and notebooks to access the corporate network. IT is under pressure to accommodate these personal devices in a fine-grained manner while protecting corporate data and intellectual property and meeting compliance mandates.

The rise of cloud services
Enterprises have enthusiastically embraced both public and private cloud services, resulting in unprecedented growth of these services. Many enterprise businesses want the agility to access applications, infrastructure and other IT resources on demand and discretely. IT planning for cloud services must be performed in an environment of increased security, compliance and auditing requirements, along with business reorganizations, consolidations and mergers that can rapidly change assumptions. Providing self-service provisioning, whether in a private or public cloud, requires elastic scaling of computing, storage and network resources, ideally from a common viewpoint and with a common suite of tools.

Big data means more bandwidth
Handling today's big data requires massive parallel processing on thousands of servers, all of which need direct connections to each other. The rise of these large data sets is fueling a constant demand for additional network capacity in the data center. Operators of hyperscale data center networks face the daunting task of scaling the network to previously unimaginable size, maintaining any-to-any connectivity within a limited budget.

Energy use in large data centers
As Internet of things, cloud computing and SaaS emerged, the need for larger data centers has increased the energy consumption of those facilities. Many researchers have improved SDN's energy efficiency by applying existing routing techniques to dynamically adjust the network data plane to save energy. Also, techniques to improve control plane energy efficiency are being researched.

== Architectural components ==
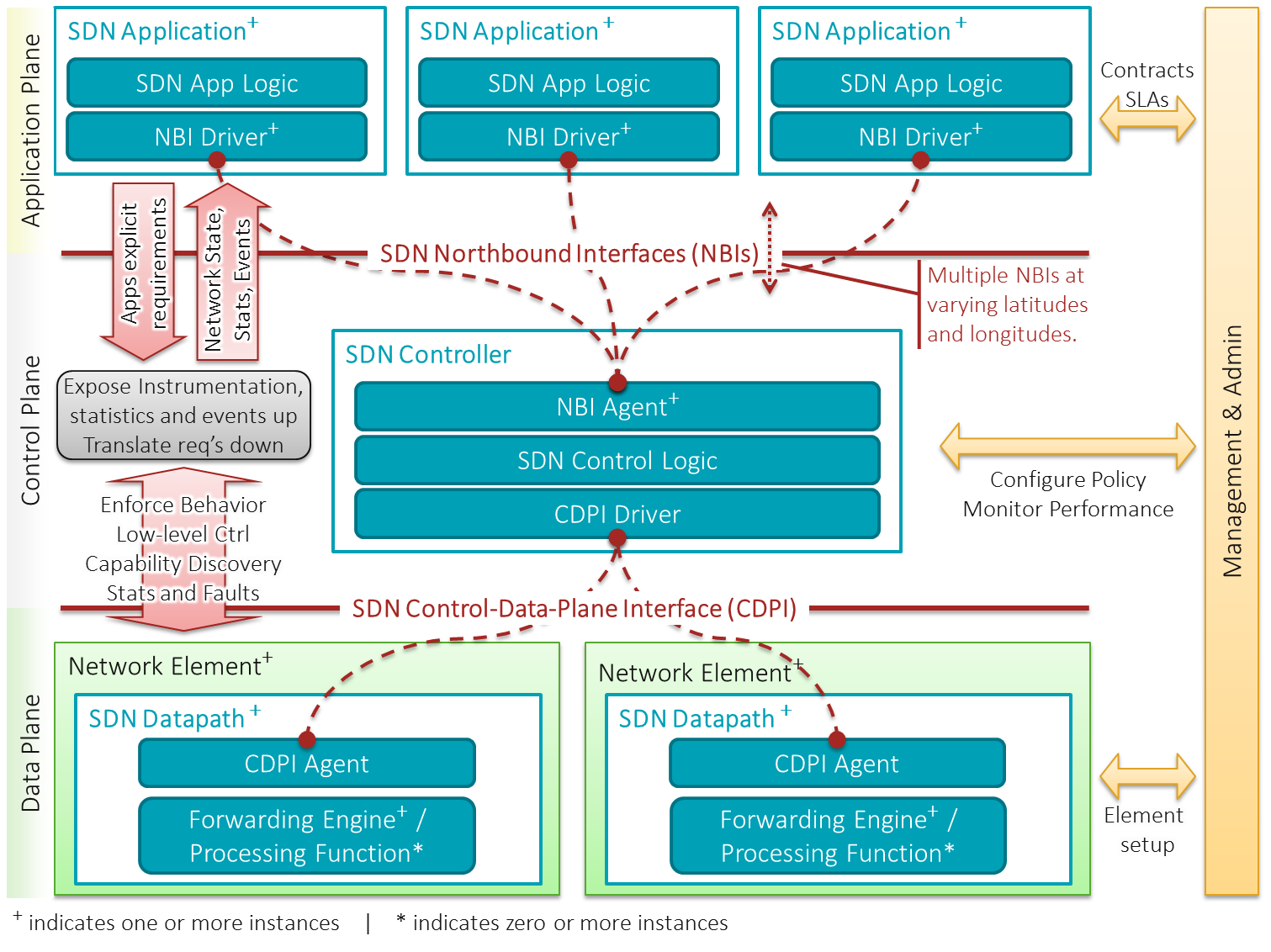
A high-level overview of the software-defined networking architecture

The following list defines and explains the SDN architectural components:

SDN application
SDN applications are programs that communicate their network requirements and desired network behavior to the SDN controller via a northbound interface (NBI). In addition, they may consume an abstracted view of the network for their internal decision-making purposes. An SDN Application consists of SDN application logic and one or more NBI drivers. SDN applications may themselves expose another layer of abstracted network control, thus offering one or more higher-level NBIs through respective NBI agents.

SDN controller
The SDN controller is a logically centralized entity in charge of (i) translating the requirements from the SDN application layer down to the SDN datapaths and (ii) providing the SDN applications with an abstract view of the network (which may include statistics and events). An SDN controller consists of one or more NBI agents, the SDN control logic, and the control-to-data-plane interface (CDPI) driver. The controller's definition as a logically centralized entity neither prescribes nor precludes implementation architectures such as the federation of multiple controllers, the hierarchical connection of controllers, communication interfaces between controllers, nor virtualization or slicing of network resources.

SDN datapath
The SDN datapath is a logical network device that exposes visibility and uncontested control over its advertised forwarding and data processing capabilities. The logical representation may encompass all or a subset of the capabilities. An SDN datapath consists of a CDPI agent and a set of one or more traffic forwarding engines and zero or more traffic processing functions. These engines and functions may include simple forwarding between the datapath's external interfaces or internal traffic processing or termination functions. One or more SDN datapaths may be contained in a single (physical) network element—an integrated physical combination of communications resources, managed as a unit. An SDN datapath may also be defined across multiple physical network elements. This logical definition neither prescribes nor precludes implementation details such as the logical to physical mapping, management of shared physical resources, virtualization or slicing of the SDN datapath, interoperability with non-SDN networking, nor the data processing functionality, which can include OSI layer 4-7 functions.

SDN Control to Data-Plane Interface (CDPI)
The SDN CDPI is the interface defined between an SDN controller and an SDN datapath, which provides at least programmatic control of all forwarding operations, capabilities advertisement, statistics reporting, and event notification. One value of SDN lies in the expectation that the CDPI is implemented in an open, vendor-neutral and interoperable way.

SDN Northbound Interfaces (NBI)
SDN NBIs are interfaces between SDN applications and SDN controllers and typically provide abstract network views and enable direct expression of network behavior and requirements. This may occur at any level of abstraction and across different sets of functionality.

== SDN control plane ==
The implementation of the SDN control plane can follow a centralized, hierarchical, or decentralized design. Initial SDN control plane proposals focused on a centralized solution, where a single control entity had a global view of the network. While this simplifies the implementation of the control logic, it has scalability limitations as the size and dynamics of the network increase. To overcome these limitations, hierarchical and distributed approaches have been proposed. In hierarchical solutions, controllers operate on a partitioned network view, while decisions that require network-wide knowledge are taken by a logically centralized root controller. In distributed approaches, controllers operate on their local view or they may exchange synchronization messages to enhance their knowledge. Distributed solutions are more suitable for supporting adaptive SDN applications.

A key issue when designing a distributed SDN control plane is to decide on the number and placement of control entities. An important parameter to consider while doing so is the propagation delay between the controllers and the network devices, especially in the context of large networks. Other objectives that have been considered involve control path reliability, fault tolerance, and application requirements.

== SDN data plane ==
In SDN, the data plane is responsible for processing data-carrying packets using a set of rules specified by the control plane. The data plane may be implemented in physical hardware switches or in software, such as Open vSwitch. The memory capacity of hardware switches may limit the number of rules that can be stored whereas software implementations may have higher capacity.

The location of the SDN data plane and agent can be used to classify SDN implementations:

- Hardware switch-based: This approach implements the data plane processing inside a physical device. OpenFlow switches may use TCAM tables to route packet sequences (flows). These switches may use an ASIC for their implementation.
- Software switch-based: Some physical switches may implement SDN support using software on the device to populate flow tables and to act as the SDN agent when communicating with the controller. Hypervisors may likewise use software implementations to support SDN protocols in the virtual switches used to support their virtual machines.
- Host-based: Rather than deploying the data plane and SDN agent in network infrastructure, host-based SDNs deploy the SDN agent inside the operating system of the communicating endpoints. Such implementations can provide additional context about the application, user, and activity associated with network flows. To achieve the same traffic engineering capabilities of switch-based SDNs, host-based SDNs may require the use of carefully designed VLAN and spanning tree assignments.

Flow table entries may be populated in a proactive, reactive, or hybrid fashion. In the proactive mode, the controller populates flow table entries for all possible traffic matches for this switch in advance. This mode can be compared with typical routing table entries today, where all static entries are installed ahead of time. Following this, no request is sent to the controller since all incoming flows will find a matching entry. A major advantage in proactive mode is that all packets are forwarded at line rate (considering all flow table entries in TCAM) and no delay is added. In the reactive mode, entries are populated on demand. If a packet arrives without a corresponding match rule in the flow table, the SDN agent sends a request to the controller for further instruction. The controller examines the SDN agent requests and provides instructions, installing a rule in the flow table for the corresponding packet if necessary. The hybrid mode uses the low-latency proactive forwarding mode for a portion of traffic while relying on the flexibility of reactive mode processing for the remaining traffic.

== Applications ==
=== SDMN ===
Software-defined mobile networking (SDMN) is an approach to the design of mobile networks where all protocol-specific features are implemented in software, maximizing the use of generic and commodity hardware and software in both the core network and radio access network. It is proposed as an extension of SDN paradigm to incorporate mobile network specific functionalities. Since 3GPP Rel.14, a Control User Plane Separation was introduced in the Mobile Core Network architectures with the PFCP protocol.

=== SD-WAN ===
An SD-WAN is a WAN managed using the principles of software-defined networking. The main driver of SD-WAN is to lower WAN costs using more affordable and commercially available leased lines, as an alternative or partial replacement of more expensive MPLS lines. Control and management are administered separately from the hardware, with central controllers allowing for easier configuration and administration.

=== SD-LAN ===
An SD-LAN is a Local area network (LAN) built around the principles of software-defined networking, though there are key differences in topology, network security, application visibility and control, management and quality of service. SD-LAN decouples control, management and data planes to enable a policy-driven architecture for wired and wireless LANs. SD-LANs are characterized by their use of a cloud management system and wireless connectivity without the presence of a physical controller.

=== Security using the SDN paradigm ===
SDN architecture may enable, facilitate or enhance network-related security applications due to the controller's central view of the network and its capacity to modify behavior or the data plane at any time. The security implications of SDN architecture remain under study.

Several research works on SDN have already investigated security applications built upon the SDN controller, with different aims in mind. Distributed denial of service (DDoS) detection and mitigation, as well as botnet and worm propagation, are some concrete use cases of such applications. Proposed applications periodically collect network statistics from the forwarding plane of the network in a standardized manner (e.g., using OpenFlow), and then apply classification algorithms on those statistics in order to detect any network anomalies. If an anomaly is detected, the application instructs the controller how to reprogram the data plane in order to mitigate it.

Another kind of security application leverages the SDN controller by implementing some moving target defense (MTD) algorithms. MTD algorithms are typically used to make any attack on a given system or network more difficult than usual by periodically hiding or changing key properties of that system or network. In traditional networks, implementing MTD algorithms is not a trivial task since it is difficult to build a central authority able to determine, for each part of the system to be protected, which key properties are hidden or changed. In an SDN network, such tasks become more straightforward thanks to the centrality of the controller. One application can, for example, periodically assign virtual IPs to hosts within the network, and the mapping of virtual IP to real IP is then performed by the controller. Another application can simulate some fake opened/closed/filtered ports on random hosts in the network in order to add significant noise during scanning performed by an attacker.

Additional value regarding security in SDN-enabled networks can also be gained using FlowVisor and FlowChecker. The former tries to use a single hardware forwarding plane sharing multiple separated logical networks. Following this approach, the same hardware resources can be used for production and development purposes as well as separating monitoring, configuration and Internet traffic, where each scenario can have its own logical topology, which is called a slice. In conjunction with this approach, FlowChecker realizes the validation of new OpenFlow rules that are deployed by users using their own slice.

SDN controller applications are mostly deployed in large-scale scenarios, which require comprehensive checks of possible programming errors. A system to do this called NICE was described in 2012. Introducing an overarching security architecture requires a comprehensive and protracted approach to SDN. Since it was introduced, designers have looked at possible ways to secure SDN that do not compromise scalability. One architecture is called SN-SECA (SDN+NFV) Security Architecture.

=== Group data delivery using SDN ===
Distributed applications that run across datacenters usually replicate data for the purpose of synchronization, fault resiliency, load balancing and getting data closer to users (which reduces latency to users and increases their perceived throughput). Also, many applications, such as Hadoop, replicate data within a datacenter across multiple racks to increase fault tolerance and make data recovery easier. All of these operations require data delivery from one machine or datacenter to multiple machines or datacenters. The process of reliably delivering data from one machine to multiple machines is referred to as Reliable Group Data Delivery (RGDD).

SDN switches can be used for RGDD via installation of rules that allow forwarding to multiple outgoing ports. For example, OpenFlow provides support for Group Tables since version 1.1, which makes this possible. Using SDN, a central controller can carefully and intelligently set up forwarding trees for RGDD. Such trees can be built while paying attention to network congestion and load status to improve performance. For example, MCTCP is a scheme for delivery to many nodes inside datacenters that relies on regular and structured topologies of datacenter networks while DCCast and QuickCast are approaches for fast and efficient data and content replication across datacenters over private WANs.

== Relationship to network function virtualization ==
Network function virtualization (NFV) is a concept that complements SDN. Thus, NFV is not dependent on SDN or SDN concepts. NFV separates software from hardware to enable flexible network deployment and dynamic operation. NFV deployments typically use commodity servers to run software versions of network services that previously were hardware-based. These software-based services that run in an NFV environment are called virtual network functions (VNFs). A SDN-NFV hybrid program was provided for high efficiency, elastic and scalable capabilities NFV aimed at accelerating service innovation and provisioning using standard IT virtualization technologies. SDN provides the agility of controlling the generic forwarding devices such as routers and switches by using SDN controllers. On the other hand, NFV agility is provided for network applications by using virtualized servers. It is entirely possible to implement a virtualized network function (VNF) as a standalone entity using existing networking and orchestration paradigms. However, there are inherent benefits in leveraging SDN concepts to implement and manage an NFV infrastructure, particularly when looking at the management and orchestration of VNFs, and that's why multivendor platforms are being defined that incorporate SDN and NFV in concerted ecosystems.

== Relationship to DPI ==
Deep packet inspection (DPI) provides the network with application awareness, while SDN provides applications with network awareness. Although SDN will change the generic network architectures, it is expected to continue working with traditional network architectures, including routers and switches and DPI security appliances.

== Quality of experience estimation using SDN ==
The first step in estimating quality of experience is to classify the traffic. The SDN system can solve critical problems on its own by analyzing the traffic.

== See also ==
- Active networking
- Frenetic (programming language)
- Data Plane Development Kit (DPDK)
- List of SDN controller software
- Network virtualization
- ONOS
- OpenDaylight Project
- Software-defined data center
- Software-defined protection
- Virtual Distributed Ethernet
