= Management plane =

In computer networking, the management plane of a networking device is the element of a system that configures, monitors, and provides management, monitoring and configuration services to, all layers of the network stack and other parts of the system. It should be distinguished from the control plane, which is primarily concerned with routing table and forwarding information base computation.

In system diagrams, the management plane is typically shown in three dimensions as overlapping the network stack, separated by a dimension that delineates the power plane, control plane, data plane, and management plane.

== See also ==
- Control plane
- Data Plane
- Management interface
