= Software-defined mobile network =

Software-defined mobile networking (SDMN) is an approach to the design of mobile networks where all protocol-specific features are implemented in software, maximizing the use of generic and commodity hardware and software in both the core network and radio access network (RAN).

== History ==
Through the 20th century, telecommunications technology was driven by hardware development, with most functions implemented in special-purpose equipment. In the early 2000s, generally available CPUs became cheap enough to enable commercial software-defined radio (SDR) technology and softswitches. SDMN extends these trends into the design of mobile networks, moving nearly all network functions into software.

The term "software-defined mobile network" first appeared in public literature in early 2014, used independently by Lime Microsystems and researchers from University of Oulu, Finland.

== Limitations of hardware-based mobile networks ==
Mobile networks based on special-purpose hardware suffer from the following limitations:

- They have limited provisions for upgrades and usually must be replaced entirely when new standards are introduced.
- The individual components are not scalable in terms of performance and capacity, because the capacity of a component is fixed by the hardware implementation.
- Specialized equipment and its associated specialized software require vendor-specific training for the mobile operator's staff.
- Specialized hardware systems are usually supported and serviced by a single vendor, resulting in vendor lock-in.

== Characteristics of SDMN designs ==
=== Use of software-defined radio ===
SDR is an important element of SDMN, because it replaces protocol-specific radio hardware with protocol-agnostic digital transceivers. While many earlier digital radio systems used field-programmable gate arrays (FPGAs) or special-purposed digital signal processors (DSPs) for calculations on baseband radio waveforms, the SDMN approach moves all of the baseband processing into general-purpose CPUs. SDMN radio systems also use hardware with publicly-documented interfaces that is designed to be readily reproducible by multiple manufacturers.

=== Commodity components ===
SDMN designs avoid the use of components that are specialized as to their functions or that are available from only a single vendor. This is true of both the hardware and software elements of the network.

=== Software switching and transcoding ===
The telephony switches of SDMN networks are software-based, including software transcoding for speech codecs.

=== Centralized, distributed, or hybrid? ===
A new SDN architecture for wireless distribution systems (WDSs) is explored that eliminates the need for multi-hop flooding of route information and therefore enables WDNs to easily expand. The key idea is to split network control and data forwarding by using two separate frequency bands. The forwarding nodes and the SDN controller exchange link-state information and other network control signaling in one of the bands, while actual data forwarding takes place in the other band.

== Advantages of SDMN ==
The SDMN approach has many advantages over hardware-based mobile network designs.

- Because SDMN hardware is protocol-agnostic, upgrades are software-only, even across technology generations. In the radio network, these changes can even be made on a site-by-site basis.
- Because SDMN hardware is designed to be easily sourced and reproduced:
  - SDMN equipment can be serviced by a wider range of vendors, lowering maintenance costs.
  - SDMN equipment can be manufactured anywhere in the world, lowering production costs.
- Because SDMN software is based on commodity operating systems and development tools:
  - Support staff can be trained more quickly because they are already familiar with the underlying software systems.
  - Many aspects of the SDMN can be monitored and managed with pre-existing tools, because they are already available in the commodity operating systems.
- Because SDMN network components run on general purpose computers, the network components can be scaled up in capacity by adding more computing power.
