= Clean Slate Act (New York) =

New York state law

The Clean Slate Act (CPL 160.57) is a state law passed in New York State in the United States of America that will automatically seal an individual's New York State criminal records after three years for a misdemeanor and eight years for a felony. The law does not apply to some offenses.

The law went into effect on November 16, 2024.

In response to the law, the Judicial Process Commission stated "The passing of the Clean Slate Act, which aims to eradicate perpetual punishment, is a great win for those impacted by the criminal justice system."

The New York State Assembly stated that "The Clean Slate Act (A.1029-C) automatically seals certain criminal records to give more New Yorkers a second chance, reduce recidivism and contribute to their communities."
