= Open Networking Foundation =

Operator led networking technology consortium

- Abbreviation: ONF
- Formation: March 21, 2011
- Dissolved: December 2023; 2 years ago; merged with Linux Foundation
- Type: 501(c)(6) NPO
- Purpose: Open Source networking software and Software Defined Standards
- Website: www.opennetworking.org

The Open Networking Foundation (ONF) was a non-profit operator-led consortium. It used an open source business model aimed at promoting networking through software-defined networking (SDN) and standardizing the OpenFlow protocol and related technologies. The standards-setting and SDN-promotion group was formed out of recognition that cloud computing will blur the distinctions between computers and networks. The initiative was meant to speed innovation through simple software changes in telecommunications networks, wireless networks, data centers and other networking areas.

In December 2023, ONF announced it was merging with the Linux Foundation (LF). Three of ONF's projects - LF Broadband, Aether and P4 - were transferred to the Linux Foundation and would be subject to a new governance structure. As part of the merger, ONF handed over $5 million in funding to staff and operate their projects.

== History ==
Google's adoption of OpenFlow software was discussed by Urs Hölzle at a trade show promoting OpenFlow in April, 2012. Hölzle is the chairman ONF's board of directors, serving on the board along with representatives of the other five founding board members plus NTT Communications and Goldman Sachs. Stanford University professor Nick McKeown and U.C. Berkeley professor Scott Shenker also serve on the board as founding directors representing themselves.

The ONF launched a continuous certification program for products and equipment in the telecom and networking space. As part of certification, the Open Compute Project (OCP) is collaborating with ONF in this new program to promote the use of OCP-recognized open hardware in ONF solutions.

In 2017 the ONF completed its merger with the Open Networking Lab (ON.Lab). The resulting entity retained the ONF name in 2017.

In 2018 the ONF established its Technical Leadership Team (TLT).

In 2019 the ONF announced the public release of three Reference Designs (RDs): SEBA, Trellis and ODTN.

In 2019, the ONF announced that it had combined with P4.org and would be the host for all activities and working groups related to the development of the P4 programming language moving forward.

In 2020 T-Mobile Poland Announced with the ONF that it had achieved production roll-out of OMEC, the ONF's Open Source Mobile Evolved Packet Core

In 2020 the Open Networking Foundation announced the release of Aether, the first open source platform for 5G, LTE and edge as a cloud services. By June 2020, the ONF grew to over 200 member companies. Member companies include networking-equipment vendors, semiconductor companies, computer companies, software companies, telecom service providers, hyperscale data-center operators, and enterprise users.

In 2021, the Open Networking Foundation announced its SD Core project with the goal of building an open source 5G/4G disaggregated mobile core.

In 2021, the Open Networking Foundation announced its SD Fabric project addressing Hybrid and Edge cloud.

In 2021, the Open Networking Foundation spun out Ananki as a for-profit sister organization to commercialize Aether as a Private 5G service for Industry 4.0 transformation.

In 2022, the Open Networking Foundation announced its SD RAN™ project was fully released to open source.

In 2022, the Open Networking Foundation announced its Aether™ private 5G project was fully released to open source.

In 2023, ONF launched the Sustainable Mobile and RAN Transformation (SMaRT) 5G project which is focused on developing, demonstrating and open sourcing ML-driven, intelligent energy savings solutions for mobile networks. Initial collaborators include Intel, META/TIP, Rimedo Labs and Rutgers WINLAB. More participants are invited to join this community effort.

In December 2023, ONF announced it has merged with the Linux Foundation (LF).
