= Electronic quantum holography =

Information storage technology

Electronic quantum holography (also known as quantum holographic data storage) is a holographic imagery and information storage technology based on the principles of electron holography. By recording both the amplitude and phase of electron waves through interference using a reference wave, electronic quantum holography can encode and read out data at high precision and density, storing as much as 35 bits per electron.

Electronic quantum holography differs from classical holography in discussing the fundamental principles of each technology. Typically, classical holography relies on optical coherence, using the interference between a reference beam and an object beam to record the phase (the position of the wave) and amplitude (the height of the wave) of light. Because this process depends on stable, first-order interference, classical holography requires coherent and well-aligned light sources. Additionally, the performance of classical holography can falter under unstable conditions such as mechanical vibrations, random phase fluctuations, or stray illumination.

By contrast, electronic quantum holography, and quantum holography itself, encode holographic information in the second-order coherence of entangled photon pairs rather than first-order coherence. Through the use of spatial-polarization hyper-entangled photons (photons that are linked in both their physical path and the direction of their light wave's vibration), quantum holography can reconstruct phase images through coincidence measurements even when illumination is incoherent or unpolarized. This allows for remote interference between photons that do not share overlapping paths, provides protection from noise and phase disorder, and can produce enhanced spatial resolution compared to classical holography.

== History ==
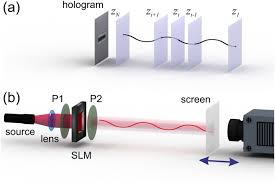
Dennis Gabor Holography Model

While working with electron microscopy, Hungarian physicist Dennis Gabor recognized that image distortion caused by the spherical aberration of electron lenses limited resolution. To address this, he proposed a lens-less imaging method that used the wave nature of electrons to record and reconstruct the complete wavefront, both its amplitude and phase, resulting in what became known as a hologram. The practical application of electron holography emerged only later, as it required a more advanced understanding of electron interference and specialized instrumentation. Gabor's work in classical holography in 1948 would eventually lead to him winning a Nobel Prize in 1971.

In 1968, German physicists Gottfried Möllenstedt and Gerd Wahl found that Gabor's lens-less approach was not ideal for electron microscopy. They developed the method of image-plane off-axis holography, which became one of the most successful and widely used techniques in electron holography. Similarly, American electrical engineer Emmet Leith had conducted research on off-axis holography in the 1960's, and his work helped advance holography into popularity alongside Möllenstedt and Wahl's work.

The invention of digital holography emerged in the late 1960's, as J.W.Goodman, an American electrical engineer and physicist, proposed the idea of reconstructing an image of an object through electronically recording holograms. This breakthrough in digital holography grew in prominence with the development of charge-coupled devices, as the introduction of these devices enabled quantitative phase imaging, and the generation of digital image reconstructions.

As developments in digital holography continued, the field slowly began to see the incorporation of quantum mechanics. Developments involving consistent electron sources and digital image reconstruction allowed for scientists to retrieve the full wavefunction of the electron. This was one of the first bridges between digital and electronic quantum holography, as the reconstructed wavefront represents the quantum mechanical wavefunction of the electron beam instead of an optical analogue. Techniques based on the Aharonov-Bohm effect, which depend closely on the wavefunction phase were able to further demonstrate that holography could detect phase shifts stemming from electromagnetic potentials; even in areas that did not contain any electric or magnetic field. This set precedent for holography as a practical method for probing different quantum phenomena, such as gauge fields, magnetic flux, and microscopic electromagnetic structures.

As research entered the early 2000's, ultrafast electron microscopy and femtosecond-scale electron pulses allowed for time-resolved holography, enabling studies of rapid electron-wave dynamics. This would all eventually lay the foundation for quantum holography.

== Early developments ==
Scanning Tunneling Microscope schematic

In 2009, Stanford University's Department of Physics set a new world record for the smallest writing using a scanning tunneling microscope and electron waves to write the initials "SU" at 0.3 nanometers, surpassing the previous record set by IBM in 1989 using xenon atoms. This achievement also set a record for the density of information. Before this technology was invented the density of information had not exceeded one bit per atom. Researchers of electronic quantum holography however were able to push the limit to 35 bits per electron or 20 bits nm^{−2}.

Later, in 2019, Maden et al. explored a new holographic imaging technique using ultrafast transmission electron microscopy to visualize electromagnetic fields. They introduced both local and nonlocal holography techniques that improved time resolution, allowing researchers to measure the phase and group velocities of surface plasmon polaritons with high precision.

In particular, the nonlocal approach allowed scientists to separate the reference and probe fields, which was a limitation in earlier optical approaches. This breakthrough would open the door to the possibility of studying quantum effects and collective excitations such as excitons, phonons, and polarizabilities at an atomic and sub femtosecond scale.

== Recent advancements ==
In 2022, Töpfer et al. worked on developing techniques to capture holograms using photon pairs without directly capturing one of the photons. This method would be known as induced coherence without induced emission, and in it, researchers measure the interference of one photon to reconstruct the phase and amplitude of the undetected photon. This method proved to be a major step in improving the precision and practicality of electronic quantum holography imaging, as it improved phase stability and minimized the need for complex stabilization equipment.

In the following year, Yesharim et al. had extended holography into the quantum domain, with the development of quantum nonlinear holography. This would utilize nonlinear photonic crystals, whose patterned nonlinear coefficient shapes the spatial correlations of entangled photon pairs generated through spontaneous parametric down-conversion. Additionally, unlike typical nonlinear holography, which uses simulated optical processes, quantum nonlinear holography uses photon pairs that are generated by vacuum fluctuations, allowing the crystal structure to select specific signal-idler mode pairs while suppressing others. Using two-dimensional electric-field-poled KTP crystals (potassium titanyl phosphate crystals), the ability to directly imprint Hermite-Gauss mode patterns into the nonlinear medium was demonstrated, allowing for compact generation of spatially entangled qubits and qudits without the need for pump or beam shaping. The generated states exhibited high-fidelity correlations and violated the CHSH inequality.

This method minimizes the optical complexity typically required for high-dimensional quantum state engineering and is compatible with continuous-wave lasers and on-chip photonic integration. Further development using segmented and cascaded poling structures or future three-dimensional nonlinear photonic crystals, are expected to extend the range of available spatial modes and further tailor quantum state generation.

Recently, in 2025, research in electronic quantum holography has begun to move beyond photonic interferometers and electron-based methods towards programmable atomic systems that can directly manipulate quantum light. In a study published in Physical Review Research, Lloyd and Bekenstein demonstrate a form of quantum holography using a two-dimensional array of Rydberg atoms to construct a "quantum meta surface". This allowed them to control the phase and amplitude of a single photon with precision. Because they were able to control the states of the photon, researchers could generate a programmable holographic pattern in the quantum wavefunction of light, demonstrating the ability for information to be stored and projected at a quantum level. As such, this research provides a stepping stone to building scalable quantum imaging and information storing technology.

== Technology ==
A copper chip is placed in a microscope and cleaned. Carbon monoxide molecules are then placed on the surface and moved around. When the electrons in copper interact with the carbon monoxide molecules, they create interference patterns that create an electronic quantum hologram. This hologram can be read like a stack of pages in a book, and can contain multiple images at different wavelengths.

In optical quantum holography, information is typically encoded using spatially entangled photon pairs created through spontaneous parametric down-conversion in nonlinear crystals. The paired photons exhibit strong correlations in position and momentum that can be measured in the image and Fourier planes of the optical system. A spatial light modulator applies a phase pattern to one of the protons, while the second photon passes through a compensating or reference path. The phase information does not appear in standard, raw intensity images. Instead, the information is accessed by computing second-order intensity correlations between symmetric detector pixels. Because the correlation function depends on the relative phase between the photons, it is possible for the hologram to be reconstructed even when only one photon interacts with the phase object.

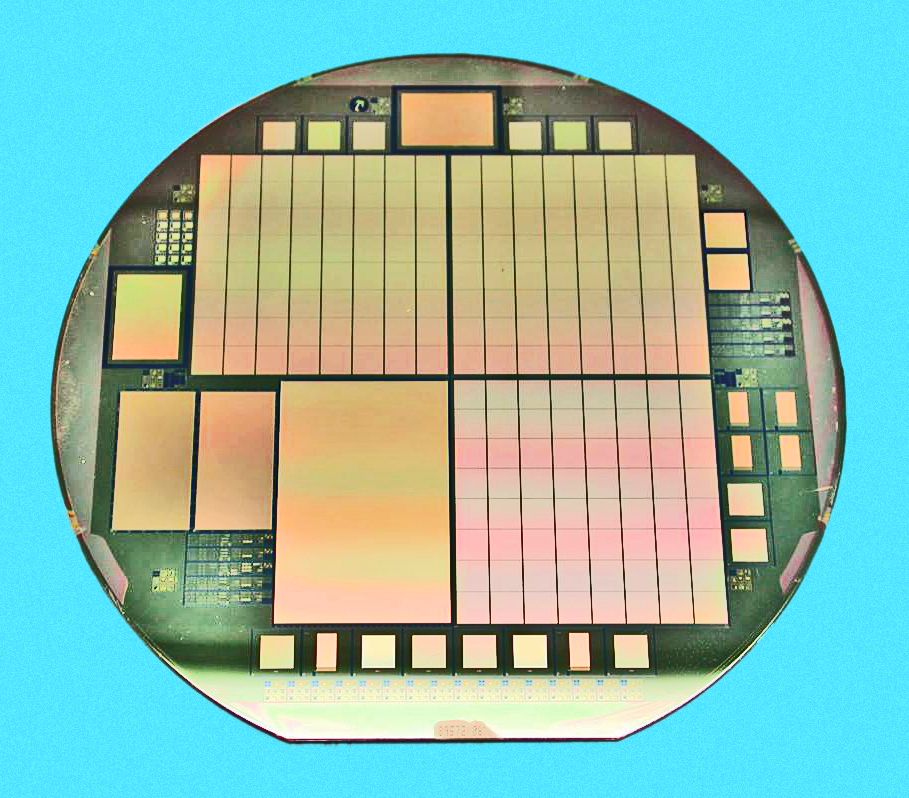
Example of a CCD

Additionally, quantum holographic systems generally depend on high-sensitivity electron-multiplying CCD detectors that capture millions of frames in order to accumulate adequate coincidence statistics. In general, spatial resolution is determined by the correlation width of the wavefunction of the two photons, which in turn determines the smallest resolvable feature in the reconstructed phase map. The phase distortions introduced by birefringent components can be measured and compensated using spatial light modulator patterns in such a way that ensures consistent measurement bases across the detector field. In contrast to classical holography, which directly reads out diffraction patterns from intensity images, quantum holography retrieves analogous information from correlation matrices, which will allow for enhanced resolution and operation at lower light levels. Both effects originate from the use of entangled photons, whose second-order coherence properties allow holographic reconstruction beyond the cutoff of the classical diffraction.

== Applications ==
Quantum holography using undetected light has potential in a wide variety of scientific and technological fields. Because the technique allows for holograms to be created without detecting the photon that illuminate the object, images can be created at wavelengths that would be otherwise difficult to measure. This has led to proposed usage in biomedical imaging. By probing an object with mid-infrared lights, which are useful for identifying biological tissue or chemical compositions, they can detect visible photons, which are easier to pick up on standard silicon-based image sensors. This approach is also viable beyond biomedical imaging, with proposed usage in materials analysis and environmental sensing, as this approach allows for a safer and more precise way to image samples that may get easily damaged through direct exposure to light.

Beyond the imaging and information storage applications of electronic quantum holography, holographic techniques have also been proposed for high-security applications. One way researchers have approached this is by creating "quantum holograms" through the usage of entangled photons on meta surfaces, enabling holographic letters. Their appearance will depend on polarization states, and will provide anti-counterfeiting and secure-communication functionalities.

In addition to these applications, electronic holographic techniques have demonstrated capabilities in material analysis at an atomic level. High-resolution electron holography enables the identification of individual atom columns in complex structures, such as a "dumbbell" structure. For example, gallium and arsenic columns in GaAs can be differentiated using phase shifts in the reconstructed electron wave, even if the atomic numbers are similar. Holography has also been applied to ferroelectric crystals, revealing local charge distributions and atomic dipoles that may be otherwise challenging to detect. Through combining precise phase measurements and high spatial resolution, researchers are able to study interfaces, nanodomains, and subtle atomic-scale distortions, providing detailed information on the structure and electronic properties of materials, and extending the use of holographic imaging beyond typical microscopy.

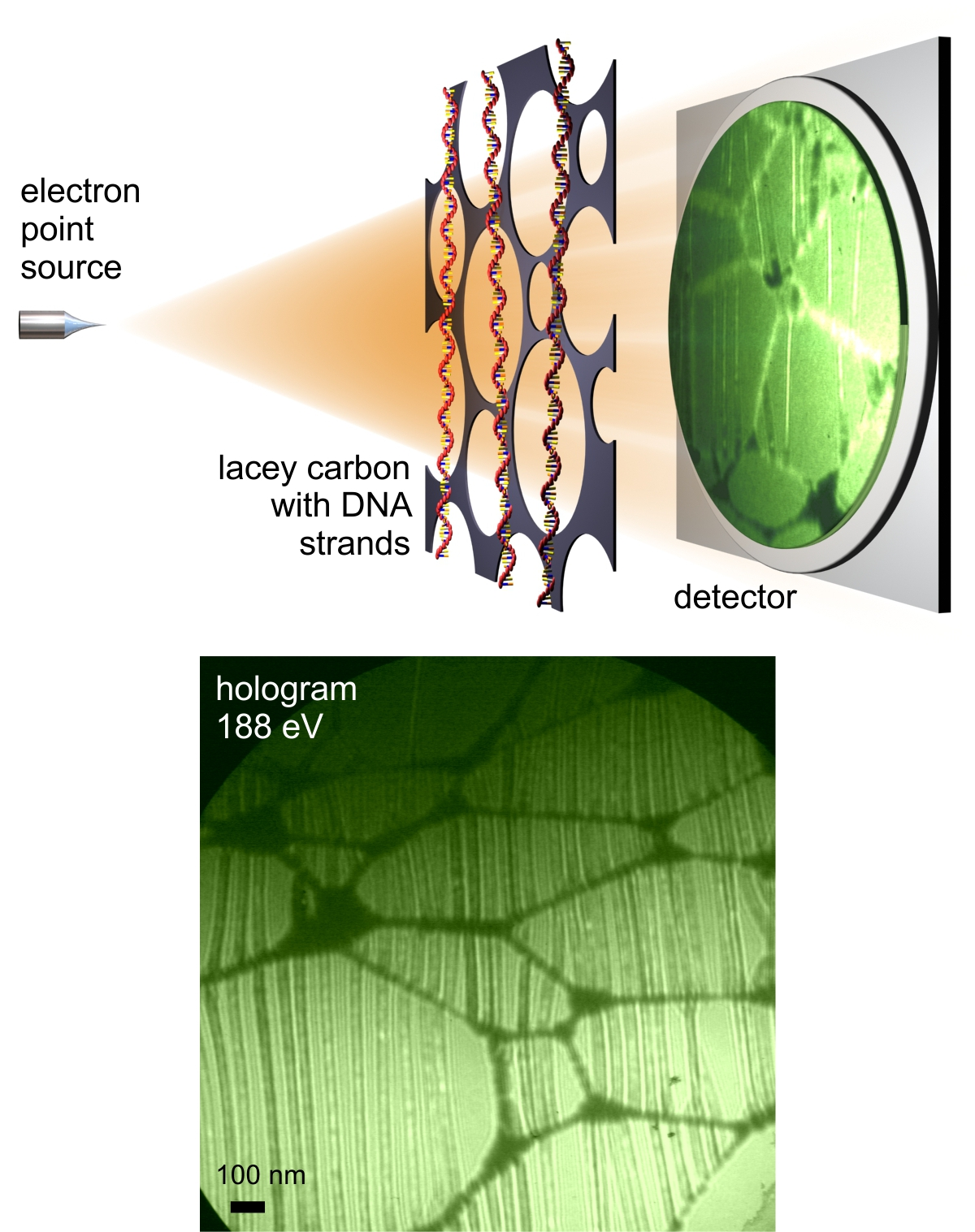
Low-energy electron holography reconstructs image of DNA

Within microscopy, new methods for imaging nanoscale structures have been developed through the use of precise phase patterns within nonlinear crystals to construct the spatial properties of photon pairs. These techniques will allow for medical imaging at a single-cell scale. To achieve this, the crystals encode spatial information provided by extremely weak optical signals into the quantum correlations of the photon pairs. Due to the hologram being imprinted during the nonlinear conversion process, the resultant light fields are able to maintain structural and phase details that typical microscopy may not. When combined with modulating optics and quantum state tomography, cell features can be reconstructed in a high-fidelity model without much photodamage, which provides an option for safely studying sensitive biological samples.
