= Intel P4 =

Intel P4 may refer to:

- Intel Pentium 4, a 7th generation Intel CPU design
- Intel 80486, a 4th generation Intel processor design
