= Yottabyte (disambiguation) =

A yottabyte (YB) is 1000^{8} bytes.

Yottabyte may also refer to:

- Yottabyte, 1024^{8} bytes, also called "yobibyte" (YiB)
- Yottabyte (song), a song by Martin Garrix
- Yottabyte LLC, a data-center company in Michigan
