= Bit =

Unit of information

bit
- Unit of: information
- Symbol: b, bit

The bit is the most basic unit of information in computing and digital communication. The name is a portmanteau of binary digit. Its symbol is either "bit" (IEC standard) or lowercase "b" (IEEE standard). Use of the latter may create confusion with capital "B", which is the international standard symbol for the byte.

The bit represents a logical state with one of two possible values. These values are most commonly represented as 1 and 0, but other representations such as true/false, yes/no, on/off, and +/− are also widely used. The relation between these values and the physical states of the underlying storage or device is a matter of convention, and different assignments may be used even within the same device or program. It may be physically implemented with a two-state device.

A contiguous group of binary digits is commonly called a bit string, a bit vector, or a single-dimensional (or multi-dimensional) bit array. A group of eight bits is called one byte, but historically, the size of the byte is not strictly defined. Frequently, half, full, double and quadruple words consist of a number of bytes that is a low power of two. A string of four bits is usually a nibble.

In information theory, one bit is the information entropy of a random binary variable that is 0 or 1 with equal probability, or the information that is gained when the value of such a variable becomes known. As a unit of information, the bit is also known as a shannon, named after Claude E. Shannon. As a measure of the length of a digital string that is encoded as symbols over a binary alphabet (i.e. $\Sigma = \{\texttt{0}, \texttt{1}\}$), the bit has been called a binit, but this usage is now rare.

In data compression, the goal is to find a shorter representation for a string, so that it requires fewer bits when stored or transmitted; the string would be compressed into the shorter representation before doing so, and then decompressed into its original form when read from storage or received. The field of algorithmic information theory is devoted to the study of the irreducible information content of a string (i.e., its shortest-possible representation length, in bits), under the assumption that the receiver has minimal a priori knowledge of the method used to compress the string. In error detection and correction, the goal is to add redundant data to a string to enable the detection or correction of errors during storage or transmission; the redundant data would be computed before doing so, and stored or transmitted, and then checked or corrected when the data is read or received.

== History ==
Ralph Hartley suggested the use of a logarithmic measure of information in 1928. Claude E. Shannon first used the word "bit" in his seminal 1948 paper "A Mathematical Theory of Communication". He attributed its origin to John W. Tukey, who had written a Bell Labs memo on 9 January 1947 in which he contracted "binary digit" to simply "bit".

== Physical representation ==
A bit can be stored by a digital device or other physical system that exists in either of two possible distinct states. These may be the two stable states of a flip-flop, two positions of an electrical switch, two distinct voltage or current levels allowed by a circuit, two distinct levels of light intensity, two directions of magnetization or polarization, the orientation of reversible double-stranded DNA, etc.

Perhaps the earliest example of a binary storage device was the punched card invented by Basile Bouchon and Jean-Baptiste Falcon (1732), developed by Joseph Marie Jacquard (1804), and later adopted by Semyon Korsakov, Charles Babbage, Herman Hollerith, and early computer manufacturers like IBM. A variant of that idea was the perforated paper tape. In all those systems, the medium (card or tape) conceptually carried an array of hole positions; each position could be either punched through or not, thus carrying one bit of information per potential hole location. The encoding of text by bits was also used in Morse code (1844) and early digital communications machines such as teleprinters (1870).

The first electrical devices for discrete logic (such as elevator and traffic light control circuits, telephone switches, and Konrad Zuse's computer) represented bits as the states of electrical relays, which could be either open or closed. These relays functioned as mechanical switches, physically toggling between states to represent binary data, forming the fundamental building blocks of early computing and control systems. When relays were replaced by vacuum tubes, starting in the 1940s, computer builders experimented with a variety of storage methods, such as pressure pulses traveling down a mercury delay line, charges stored on the inside surface of a cathode ray tube, or opaque spots printed on glass discs by photolithographic techniques.

In the 1950s and 1960s, these methods were largely supplanted by magnetic storage devices such as magnetic-core memory, magnetic tapes, drums, and disks, where a bit was represented by the polarity of magnetization of a certain area of a ferromagnetic film, or by a change in polarity from one direction to the other. The same principle was later used in the magnetic bubble memory developed in the 1980s, and is still found in various magnetic strip items such as metro tickets and some credit cards.

In modern semiconductor memory, such as dynamic random-access memory or a solid-state drive, the two values of a bit are represented by two levels of electric charge stored in a capacitor or a floating-gate MOSFET. In certain types of programmable logic arrays and read-only memory, a bit may be represented by the presence or absence of a conducting path at a certain point of a circuit. In optical discs, a bit is encoded as the presence or absence of a microscopic pit on a reflective surface. In one-dimensional bar codes and two-dimensional QR codes, bits are encoded as lines or squares which may be either black or white.

In modern digital computing, bits are transformed in Boolean logic gates.

=== Transmission and processing ===
Bits are transmitted one at a time in serial transmission. By contrast, multiple bits are transmitted simultaneously in a parallel transmission. A serial computer processes information in either a bit-serial or a byte-serial fashion. From the standpoint of data communications, a byte-serial transmission is an 8-way parallel transmission with binary signalling.

In programming languages such as C, a bitwise operation operates on binary strings as though they are vectors of bits, rather than interpreting them as binary numbers.

Data transfer rates are usually measured in decimal SI multiples. For example, a channel capacity may be specified as 8 kbit/s = 1 kB/s.

=== Storage ===
File sizes are often measured in (binary) IEC multiples of bytes, for example, 1 KiB = 1024 bytes = 8192 bits. Confusion may arise in cases where (for historic reasons) file sizes are specified with binary multipliers using the ambiguous prefixes K, M, and G rather than the IEC standard prefixes Ki, Mi, and Gi.

Mass storage devices are usually measured in decimal SI multiples, for example, 1 TB = 10^{12} bytes.

Confusingly, the storage capacity of a directly addressable memory device, such as a DRAM chip, or an assemblage of such chips on a memory module, is specified as a binary multiple—using the ambiguous prefix G rather than the IEC-recommended Gi prefix. For example, a DRAM chip that is specified (and advertised) as having 1 GB of capacity has $2^{30}$ bytes of capacity. As of 2022, the difference between the popular understanding of a memory system with 8 GB of capacity and the SI-correct meaning of 8 GB was still causing difficulty to software designers.

== Unit and symbol ==
The bit is not defined in the International System of Units (SI). However, the International Electrotechnical Commission issued standard IEC 60027, which specifies that the symbol for a binary digit should be bit, and this should be used in all multiples, such as kbit, for kilobit. However, the lower-case letter b is widely used as well and was recommended by the IEEE 1541 Standard (2002). In contrast, the uppercase letter B is the standard and customary symbol for byte.

=== Multiple bits ===
Multiple-bit units
Decimal			Binary					
Value	SI		Value	IEC		JEDEC		
1000	kbit	kilobit	1024	Kibit	kibibit	Kbit	Kb	kilobit
1000^{2}	Mbit	megabit	1024^{2}	Mibit	mebibit	Mbit	Mb	megabit
1000^{3}	Gbit	gigabit	1024^{3}	Gibit	gibibit	Gbit	Gb	gigabit
1000^{4}	Tbit	terabit	1024^{4}	Tibit	tebibit	—		
1000^{5}	Pbit	petabit	1024^{5}	Pibit	pebibit	—		
1000^{6}	Ebit	exabit	1024^{6}	Eibit	exbibit	—		
1000^{7}	Zbit	zettabit	1024^{7}	Zibit	zebibit	—		
1000^{8}	Ybit	yottabit	1024^{8}	Yibit	yobibit	—		
1000^{9}	Rbit	ronnabit	1024^{9}	Ribit	robibit	—		
1000^{10}	Qbit	quettabit	1024^{10}	Qibit	quebibit	—		
Orders of magnitude of data

Multiple bits may be expressed and represented in several ways. For the convenience of representing recurring groups of bits in information technology, several units of information have traditionally been used. The most common is the unit byte, coined by Werner Buchholz in June 1956, which historically was used to represent the group of bits used to encode a single character of text in a computer and for this reason it was used as the basic addressable element in many computer architectures. By 1993, the trend in hardware design had converged on the 8-bit byte. However, because of the ambiguity of relying on the underlying hardware design, the unit octet was defined to explicitly denote a sequence of eight bits.

Computers usually manipulate bits in groups of a fixed size, conventionally named "words". Like the byte, the number of bits in a word also varies with the hardware design, and is typically between 8 and 80 bits, or even more in some specialized computers. In the early 21st century, retail personal or server computers have a word size of 32 or 64 bits.

Larger numbers of bits are commonly expressed using the standard SI metric prefixes for multiples of units. These are defined from kilo- (1000 or 10^{3} units) to quetta- (10^{30}) and their values increase sequentially by a factor of one thousand. The corresponding multiple-bit units range from kilobit (kbit) to quettabit (Qbit).

== See also ==
- Baud – Symbol rate measurement in telecommunications
- Binary numeral system – Number expressed in the base-2 numeral system
- Bit rate – Information transmission rate expressed in bits per second
- Bitstream – Sequence of binary digits
- Entropy (information theory) – Average uncertainty in variable's states
- Fuzzy bit
- Integer (computer science) – Datum of integral data type
- Primitive data type – Extremely basic data type
- Qubit – Basic unit of quantum information (quantum bit)
- Shannon (unit) – Unit of information
- Trit – Ternary numeral system – Base-3 numeral system (ternary digit)
