= Yottabyte LLC =

Company

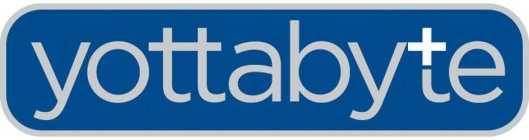
- The horizontal fullname logo for the American company Yottabyte LLC
- Industry: software-defined data center
- Founded: 2010
- Founders: Greg Campbell; Paul E. Hodges III; Duane Tursi
- Headquarters: Bloomfield Township, MI, United States
- Website: www.yottabyte.com

Yottabyte LLC was a software-defined data center (SDDC) company founded in 2010 and headquartered in Bloomfield Township, Oakland County, Michigan. Yottabyte also operates three physical data centers throughout the United States. Yottabyte software enables companies to build virtual data centers from industry standard server, storage, and networking gear and software.

== History ==
Yottabyte was founded in 2010. Its founders include Greg Campbell (Vice President of Technology), Paul E. Hodges III (President and CEO), and Duane Tursi. The Yottabyte concept originated when Campbell and Hodges were sitting in a conference room tossing around ideas. Campbell (CTO) developed the Yottabyte software architecture. .

Yottabyte LLC was named a "Cool Vendor in Compute Platform" by Gartner in 2016, and was a runner up for the Virtualization Trailblazers in 2015 by Tech Trailblazers.

In September 2016, Yottabyte partnered with the University of Michigan to accelerate data-intensive research. The project, known as the Yottabyte Research Cloud, gives scientists access to high-performance, secure and flexible computing environments that enables the analysis of sensitive data sets restricted by federal privacy laws, proprietary access agreements, or confidentiality requirements.

In May 2017, Yottabyte brought Michael J. Aloe on board as Senior Vice President of Sales & Operations. Aloe was announced as Chief Operations Officer (COO) in May 2018.

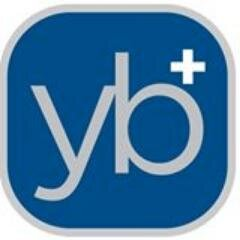
Logo

== See also ==
- Cloud storage
- Computer data storage
- Software-defined data center
- Storage virtualization
