= Nanodot =

Nanodot can refer to several technologies which use nanometer-scale localized structures. Nanodots generally exploit properties of quantum dots to localize magnetic or electrical fields at very small scales. Applications for nanodots could include high-density information storage, energy storage, and light-emitting devices.

== Information storage ==
Magnetic nanodots are being developed for future information storage. Nanodot technology could potentially store over one hundred times more data than today's hard drives. The nanodots can be thought of as tiny magnets which can switch polarity to represent a binary digit. Hard drives typically magnetize areas 200-250 nm long to store individual bits (as of 2006), while nanodots can be 50 nm in diameter or smaller. Thus nanodot-based storage could offer considerably higher information density than existing hard drives. Nanodots could also lead to ultrafast memory.

== Battery ==
In 2014 self-assembled, chemically-synthesized bio-organic peptide nanodots were proposed to reduce charging times in batteries. They are claimed to improve energy density and electrolyte performance. The new battery is said to operate like a (fast-charging) supercapacitor for charging and a (slow-discharge) battery for providing power.

=== Lithium-ion battery ===
Applications with nanodot technology have been testing in lithium-ion batteries. It has been shown that binder-free three-dimensional (3D) macro-mesoporous electrode architecture yields a high-performance supercapacitor-like lithium battery. It is about ten times more efficient compared to the current model of state-of-the-art graphite anode. This electrode architecture simultaneously allows for rapid ion transfer and ultra-short solid-phase ion diffusion resulting in an efficient new binder-free electrode technique towards the development of high-performance supercapacitor-like Li-ion batteries.

==== Lithium-sulfur battery ====
Incorporation of nanodot technology into lithium-sulfur batteries is crucial because rechargeable lithium-sulfur batteries are a significant energy-storage device owing to their eco-friendliness and high theoretical energy density. However, the shuttle effect of soluble polysulfides as well as the slow redox kinetics constrains the development of Li-S batteries. Studies have shown that the coexistence of micropores, mesopores, and macropore in the hierarchical porous carbon are beneficial for physically accommodating/immobilizing active materials sulfur and rapid charge/ion transfer, superior to the most reported biochar-based electrodes, creating an avenue to the design of multifunctional sulfur host for advanced Li-S batteries in the future.

The shuttle effect in lithium-sulfur (Li–S) batteries mainly originates from the diffusion of soluble polysulfides (LiPSs) and their depressed redox kinetics and is responsible for the progressive leakage of active material within the battery itself. Researchers have developed a layer composed of acorn shell porous carbon/Sn4P3 nanodots electrocatalyst which serve as a conductive interface but also provides a dual-adsorption barrier to retain active material and inhibit the LiPSs migrating.

=== Sodium-ion battery ===
Sodium-ion batteries are very similar to lithium-ion batteries in that they are both cations. In these cells, however, poor cycle stability due to stacking is one of its main challenges but studies have proved that sulfur nanodots are employed as an efficient anti-blocking agent of MoS2 sheet. This arrangement of these sulfur sheets exhibit a higher current density with excellent cycling stability, surviving 300 full charge/discharge cycles with a retention of 83.8%.

Sodium-ion batteries also offer an attractive option for potential low-cost, large-scale energy storage because of the earth's abundance of natural sodium. Red phosphorus is considered as a high-capacity anode for sodium-ion batteries. Like silicon in lithium-ion batteries, several limitations, such as large volume expansion upon sodiation/desodiation and low electronic conductance, inhibit the performance of red phosphorus anodes. Scientists have deposited nanodots densely and uniformly onto reduced graphene oxide sheets to minimize the sodium ion diffusion length and the sodiation/desodiation stresses and create free space to accommodate the volume variation of phosphorus particles. This results in significant performance improvement for red phosphorus anodes for sodium-ion chemistry and flexible power sources for wearable electronics and smartphone technology.

=== Potassium-ion battery ===
Researchers have shown that antimony-based materials with high theoretical capacity have been considered as a promising anode material for potassium-ion batteries (PIBs). Unfortunately, the large volume expansion leads to rapid capacity fading and poor rate capability. Ultrafine nanodots can shorten the ion's diffusion distance with the enhanced kinetic process in the battery cell. When applied as the anode for potassium-ion batteries, they all show satisfactory potassium-storage properties in terms of high reversible capacity and superior rate capability, especially the excellent electrochemical performances.

== See also ==
- Nanotechnology
- Hard drive
- Quantum dot
