= Fuzzy bit =

A fuzzy bit, also known as a flaky bit or a weak bit, is a bit cell on a digital storage medium that possesses no clear digital state. This can mean there is some expected statistical distribution for the two possible states, 0 and 1, when the bit cell is read multiple times.

== Explanation and application ==
A fuzzy bit may be an unwanted side effect of a defective storage medium or reader, but can also be a deliberately generated effect. For example, in the 1980s and 1990s, with magnetic media such as floppy disks such bits were deliberately created by poor formatting to serve as a copy protection mechanism. An example of this is the game Dungeon Master, in which inconsistency in multiple read access to such a bit was checked when loading the software and was a prerequisite for operation. Since usual floppy disk drives could not produce such bits, this was an effective mechanism for preventing illegal copies and one of the only possible approaches to circumvent such protection was to disable the check routine in the software.
