= Nonlinear photonic crystal =

Nonlinear photonic crystals are usually used as quasi-phase-matching materials. They can be one-dimensional, two-dimensional or three-dimensional.

== Nonlinear Photonic Crystals ==
Broadly speaking, nonlinear photonic crystals (PC) are periodic structures whose optical response depends on the intensity of the optical field that propagates into the crystal. An immediate consequence is that such structures have new optical properties with improved or new functionalities that cannot be obtained by using their linear counterpart, namely linear pPCs. One such example is optical tunability, that is, optical control of the response of devices based on PC. Although tunability of optical properties of photonic crystals can be achieved, for instance, by applying an electric field to an inverse opal PC infiltrated with nematic liquid crystal, by modulating the PC's index of refraction through the electro-optic effect induced by an external electric field, or through temperature-induced changes in the PC's index of refraction, high-speed operability desired for certain advanced optical communication systems can be obtained only if intrinsic optical nonlinearities in the PC material are employed. The reason for this is the ultra-fast response of certain nonlinear dielelectric materials to optical fields. In contrast to the now very extensive body of research in the properties and devices in linear photonic crystals, research into the theoretical and experimental behavior of these structures under conditions of intense optical fields, e.g. in the nonlinear regime, is still in its formative stages.

The index of refraction of a nonlinear crystal changes in response to an applied electromagnetic field. Some of the characteristics of nonlinear crystals used to generate entangled photons include:

1. Nonlinearity: The refractive index of the crystal changes with the intensity of the incident light. This is known as the nonlinear optical response.
2. Periodicity: The crystal has a regular, repeating structure. This is known as the lattice structure, which is responsible for the regular arrangement of the atoms in the crystal.
3. Optical anisotropy: The crystal has different refractive indices along different crystallographic axes.
4. Temperature and pressure sensitivity: The nonlinearity of the crystal can change with temperature and pressure, and thus the crystal should be kept in a stable temperature and pressure environment.
5. High nonlinear coefficient: a large nonlinear coefficient is desirable, this allows generation a high number of entangled photons.
6. High optical damage threshold: Crystal with high optical damage threshold can endure high intensity of the pumping beam.
7. Transparency in the desired wavelength range: It is important for the crystal to be transparent in the wavelength range of the pump beam for efficient nonlinear interactions
8. High optical quality and low absorption: The crystal should be high optical quality and low absorption to minimize loss of the pump beam and the generated entangled photons.
