= Marketecture =

Architecture produced for marketing reasons

Marchitecture (or marketecture) is a portmanteau of the words marketing and architecture. The term is applied to any form of digital architecture, especially software, intended to explain how the software works to stakeholders, investors, and other individuals who may not be as technical or familiar with the software.

The term marketecture is also used in the context of an abstract description of a complex system, such as a distributed software system, for the purpose of discussion and analysis. In his book Essential Software Architecture, Ian Gorton describes it as

[A marketecture] is one page, typically informal depiction of the system's structure and interactions. It shows the major components, their relationships and has a few well chosen labels and text boxes that portray the design philosophies embodied in the architecture. A marketecture is an excellent vehicle for facilitating discussion by stakeholders during design, build, review, and of course the sales process. It's easy to understand and explain, and serves as a starting point for deeper analysis.
