= Distributed block storage =

Computer data storage architecture

Distributed block storage is a computer data storage architecture that the data is stored in volumes (known as blocks, a term dating back to Project Stretch) across multiple physical servers, as opposed to other storage architectures like file systems which manages data as a file hierarchy, and object storage which manages data as objects. A common distributed block storage system is a Storage Area Network (SAN).

== Distributed storage ==
Distributed storage, as opposed to centralized storage, typically takes the form of a cluster of storage units, with a mechanism for data synchronization and coordination between cluster nodes. Distributed storage has several advantages.

- Scalability: support to scale the storage system horizontally by adding or removing storage units to the system.
- Redundancy: store the replication of the same data across multiple servers, for high availability, backup, and disaster recovery purposes.
- Cost saving: it is possible to use cheaper, commodity servers to store large volumes of data at low cost.
- Performance: offer better performance than a single server in some scenarios, for example, it can store data closer to its consumers, or enable massively parallel access to large files.

== Block storage ==
Block storage decouples data from the user's environment and allows the data to be spread across multiple environments. The storage is organized as blocks with unique identifiers by which they may be stored and retrieved as individual hard drives, and operating systems can connect to. It is an efficient and reliable way to store, use and manage data. The block storage can almost be used for any kinds of application, including but not limited to database storage and virtualization platform storage.

Storage blocks are generally accessed by iSCSI, Fibre Channel or Fibre Channel over Ethernet (FCoE) protocols. Block storage provides high performance for mission-critical applications and can provide high I/O performance and low latency. it is commonly used in Storage Area Network environments in place of file storage.
