= TILE-Gx =

General information
- Launched: 2010
- Discontinued: 2022
- Designed by: Tilera
- Common manufacturer: TSMC

Performance
- Max. CPU clock rate: 1000 MHz to 1200 MHz

Physical specifications
- Cores: 9, 16, 36, 72

Architecture and classification
- Technology node: 40nm
- Microarchitecture: VLIW RISC

TILE-Gx was a VLIW ISA multicore processor family designed by Tilera. It consisted of a mesh network that was expected to scale up to 100 cores, but only 72-core variants actually shipped.

After a few acquisitions, Tilera's designs ended up in the hands of Nvidia, which ended production of TILE-Gx processors in 2022. In June 2018, the Linux kernel dropped support for this architecture. Tile-Gx processors were used in MikroTik's CCR1000 series routers, and MikroTik continues to support this architecture out-of-tree in its RouterOS Linux distribution.

== Product lineup ==
Common features of TILE-Gx processors:

- 64-bit VLIW RISC core (3-issue)
- 4 MAC/cycle with SIMD extensions
- L1 cache: 64 KB (32 KB data + 32 KB instruction) per core.
- L2 cache: 256 KB per core.
- L3 cache: Other core's L2 cache connected via mesh network.
- 1, 2, or 4 ECC 72-bit DDR3 controllers.
- Up to 24 PCIe 2.0 lanes.
- Optional built-in crypto accelerator with 40 Gbit/s encryption (small packet) and 20 Gbit/s full-duplex compression, true random number generator, RSA accelerator.
- Fabrication process: TSMC 40nm.

Part	Core Frequency (GHz)	Memory Speed	PCIe Controllers/Lanes	DDR3 Controllers	Network Interfaces XAUI (10 Gb)/SGMII (1 Gb)	TDP	Crypto Engines
TILE-Gx8009			3/10	1	2/12		
TLR4-00980CG-10C	1.0	1333 MT/s	3/10	1	2/12	9 W	0
TLR4-00980CG-10CE	1.0	1333 MT/s	3/10	1	2/12	10 W	1
TLR4-00980CG-12C	1.2	1600 MT/s	3/10	1	2/12	11 W	0
TLR4-00980CG-12CE	1.2	1600 MT/s	3/10	1	2/12	12 W	1
TILE-Gx8016			2/12	2	2/12		
TLR4-01680CG-10C	1.0	1600 MT/s	2/12	2	2/12	15 W	0
TLR4-01680CG-10CE	1.0	1600 MT/s	2/12	2	2/12	15 W	1
TLR4-01680CG-12C	1.2	1600 MT/s	2/12	2	2/12	18 W	0
TLR4-01680CG-12CE	1.2	1600 MT/s	2/12	2	2/12	18 W	1
TILE-Gx8036			3/16	2	4/16		
TLR4-03680CG-10C	1.0	1600 MT/s	3/16	2	4/16	20 W	0
TLR4-03680CG-10CE	1.0	1600 MT/s	3/16	2	4/16	22 W	2
TLR4-03680CG-12C	1.2	1866 MT/s	3/16	2	4/16	26 W	0
TLR4-03680CG-12CE	1.2	1866 MT/s	3/16	2	4/16	28 W	2
TILE-Gx8072			6/24	4	8/32		
TLR4-07280CG-10C	1.0	1600 MT/s	6/24	4	8/32	? W	0
TLR4-07280CG-10CE	1.0	1600 MT/s	6/24	4	8/32	? W	2
TLR4-07280CG-12C	1.2	1866 MT/s	6/24	4	8/32	? W	0
TLR4-07280CG-12CE	1.2	1866 MT/s	6/24	4	8/32	? W	2

== See also ==
- TILE64
- TILEPro64
