= Sandy Bridge =

Intel processor microarchitecture

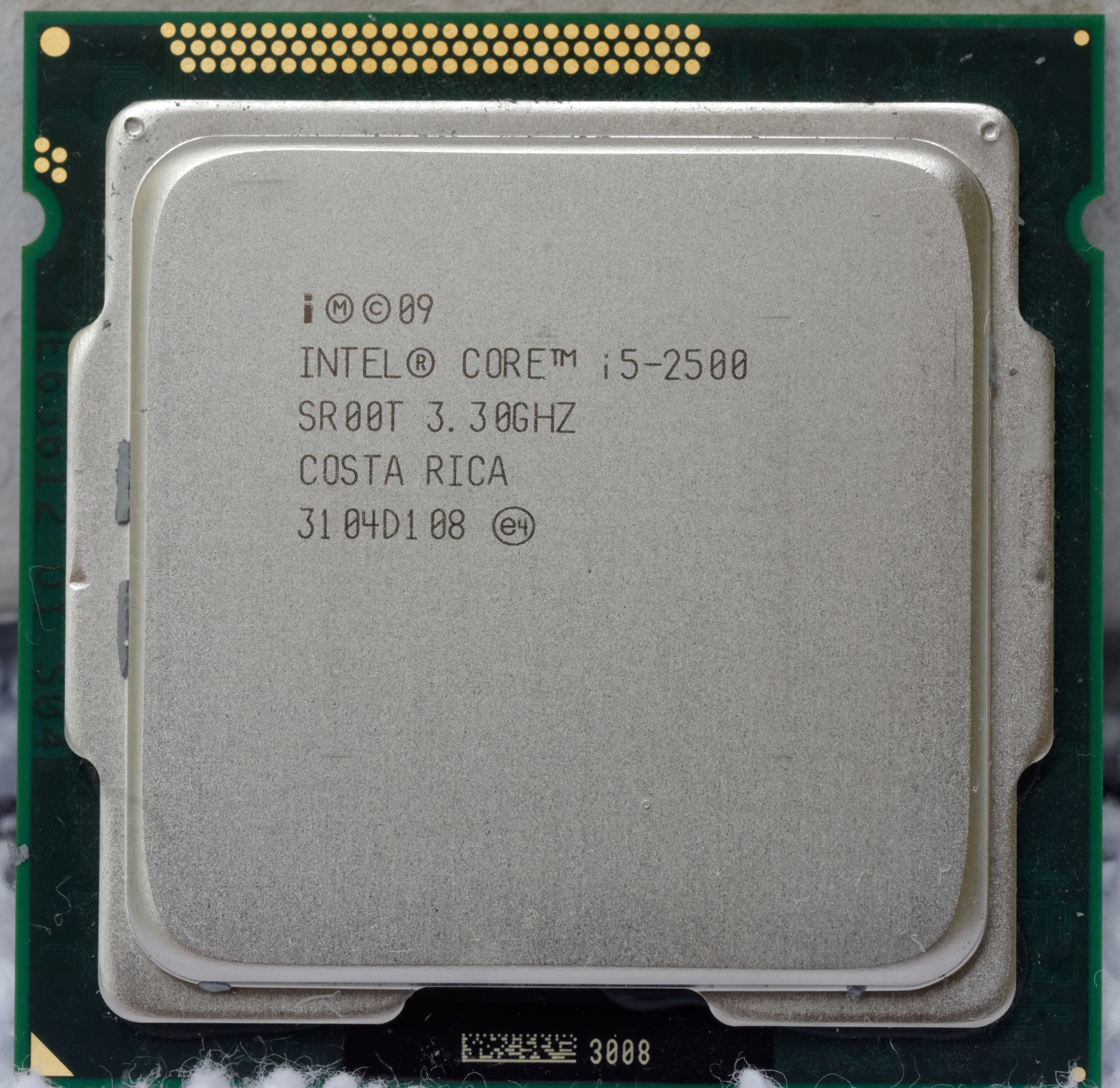
- Top of a Core i5-2500

General information
- Launched: January 9, 2011; 15 years ago
- Discontinued: September 27, 2013; 13 years ago (mobile and desktop units); November 24, 2013; 12 years ago (workstations and servers); December 27, 2015; 10 years ago (embedded devices)
- Marketed by: Intel
- Designed by: Intel
- Common manufacturer: Intel
- Product code: 80619 (extreme desktop); 80620 (server LGA1356); 80621 (server LGA2011); 80623 (desktop); 80627 (mobile)

Performance
- Max. CPU clock rate: 1.60 GHz to 3.60 GHz
- QPI speeds: 6.4 GT/s to 8.0 GT/s
- DMI speeds: 4 GT/s

Physical specifications
- Transistors: 504M to 2.27B 32nm
- Cores: 1–4 (4-6 Extreme, 2-8 Xeon)
- GPUs: HD Graphics; 650 MHz to 1100 MHz; HD Graphics 2000; 650 MHz to 1250 MHz; HD Graphics 3000; 650 MHz to 1350 MHz; HD Graphics P3000; 850 MHz to 1350 MHz
- Sockets: LGA 1155 (desktops and workstations); LGA 2011 (high-end servers); LGA 1356 (low-end, dual-processor servers); Socket G2; BGA-1023; BGA-1224; BGA-1284

Cache
- L1 cache: 64 KB per core
- L2 cache: 256 KB per core
- L3 cache: 1 MB to 8 MB shared 10 MB to 15 MB (Extreme); 3 MB to 20 MB (Xeon)

Architecture and classification
- Microarchitecture: Sandy Bridge
- Instruction set: x86-64
- Instructions: x86-16, IA-32, x86-64
- Extensions: MMX, SSE, SSE2, SSE3, SSSE3, SSE4.1, SSE4.2, AVX; VT-x, VT-d; AES-NI, CLMUL, TXT

Products, models, variants
- Product code name: Gesher
- Model: Celeron Pentium Core i3/i5/i7/i7 Extreme Xeon E3/E5

History
- Predecessors: Nehalem (tock); Westmere (tick)
- Successors: Ivy Bridge (tick); Haswell (tock)

Support status
- Unsupported

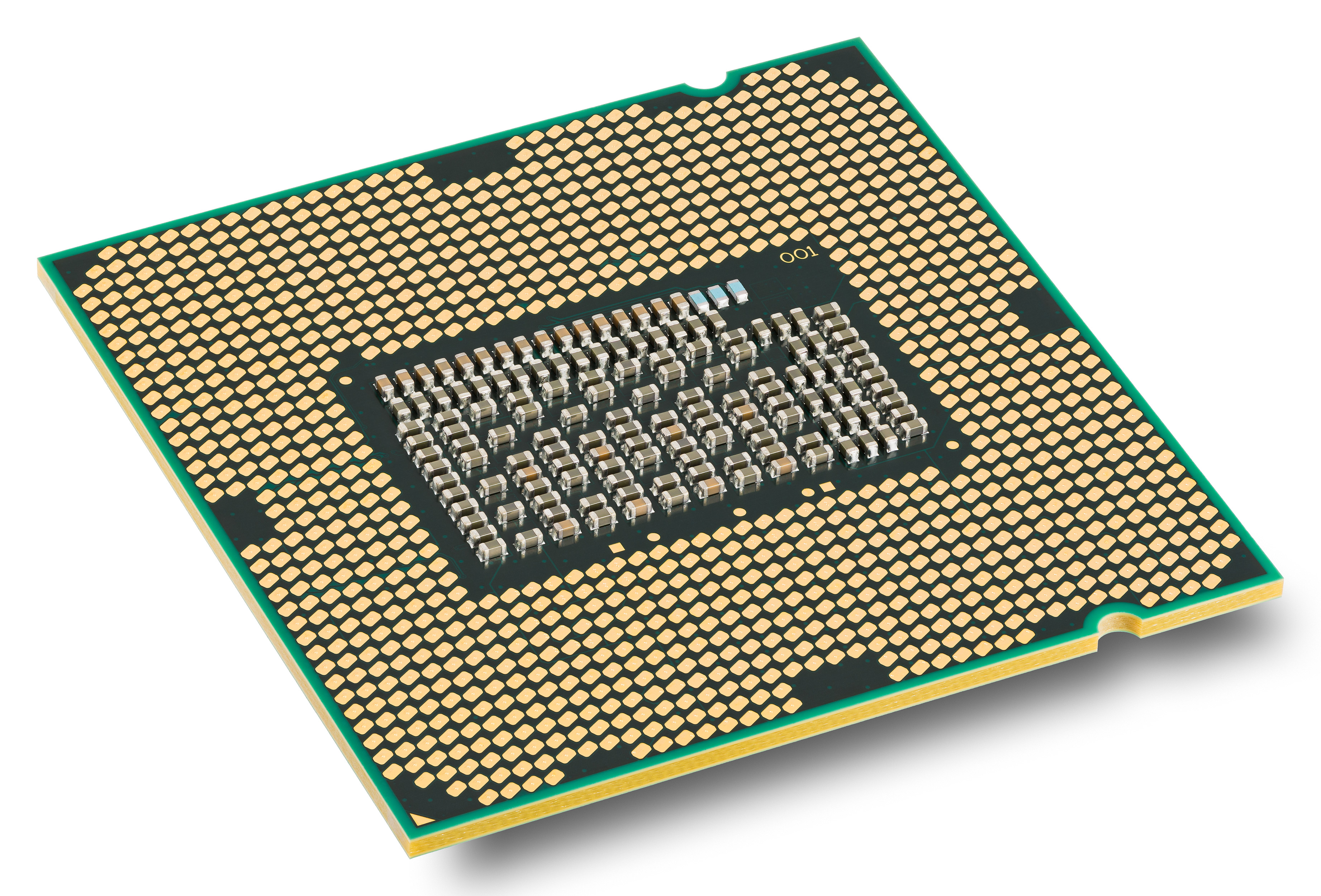
Bottom view of a Core i7-2600K

Sandy Bridge (SNB) is a 2011 CPU microarchitecture designed by Intel, manufactured using the company's 32 nm process; as the tock in Intel's Tick–tock model, it succeeds both Nehalem and Westmere. Sandy Bridge-based processors are marketed as the second generation Core, in addition to various models of the Xeon, Pentium and Celeron lineups. Intel demonstrated an A1 stepping Sandy Bridge processor in 2009 during Intel Developer Forum (IDF), and released first products based on the architecture in January 2011.

Sandy Bridge-based processors use soldered contact between the die and integrated heat spreader (IHS). Its 22 nm successor, Ivy Bridge, uses only thermal interface material (TIM) instead. However, the Sandy Bridge family was produced up until September 27, 2013 for desktop and mobile units, November 24, 2013 for workstation, high-end desktop and server units, and the end of 2015 for embedded devices.

== Technology ==
Upgraded features from Nehalem include:

=== CPU ===
- Intel Turbo Boost 2.0
- 32 KB data + 32 KB instruction L1 cache and 256 KB L2 cache per core
- Shared L3 cache which includes the processor graphics (LGA 1155)
- 64-byte cache line size
- New μOP cache, up to 1536-entry
- Improved 3 integer ALU, 2 vector ALU and 2 AGU per core
- Two load/store operations per CPU cycle for each memory channel
- Decoded micro-operation cache, and enlarged, optimized branch predictor
- Sandy Bridge retains the four branch predictors found in Nehalem: the branch target buffer (BTB), indirect branch target array, loop detector and renamed return stack buffer (RSB). Sandy Bridge has a single BTB that holds twice as many branch targets as the L1 and L2 BTBs in Nehalem.
- Improved performance for transcendental mathematics, AES encryption (AES instruction set), and SHA-1 hashing
- Supported RAPL sensor interfaces.
- 256-bit/cycle ring bus interconnect between cores, graphics, cache and System Agent Domain
- Advanced Vector Extensions (AVX) 256-bit instruction set with wider vectors, new extensible syntax and rich functionality
- Up to 8 physical cores, or 16 logical cores through hyper-threading (From 6 core/12 thread)
- Integration of the GMCH (integrated graphics and memory controller) and processor into a single die inside the processor package. In contrast, Sandy Bridge's predecessor, Clarkdale, has two separate dies (one for GMCH, one for processor) within the processor package. This tighter integration reduces memory latency even more.
- A 14- to 19-stage instruction pipeline, depending on the micro-operation cache hit or miss
- Increased ROB to 168 entries (From 128)
- Larger Scheduler buffer (54-entry, up from 26-entry)

Translation lookaside buffer sizes
Cache		Page Size		
Name	Level	4 KB	2 MB	1 GB
DTLB	1st	64	32	4
ITLB	1st	128	8 / logical core	none
STLB	2nd	512	none	none

All translation lookaside buffers (TLBs) are 4-way associative.

=== GPU ===
- Intel Quick Sync Video, hardware support for video encoding and decoding
- Integrated graphics is now integrated on the same die
- OpenGL 3.3 support (from 2.1)

=== I/O ===
- Integrated PCIe 2.0 x16 Controller

== Models and steppings ==
All Sandy Bridge processors with one, two, or four cores report the same CPUID model 0206A7h and are closely related. The stepping number cannot be seen from the CPUID but only from the PCI configuration space. The later Sandy Bridge-E processors with up to eight cores and no graphics are using CPUIDs 0206D6h and 0206D7h. Ivy Bridge CPUs all have CPUID 0306A9h to date, and are built in four different configurations differing in the number of cores, L3 cache and GPU execution units:

Die codename	CPUID	Stepping	Cores	GPU EUs	L3 cache	Socket(s)
Sandy Bridge-HE-4	0206A7h	D2	4	12	8 MB	LGA 1155, Socket G2, BGA-1023, BGA-1224
Sandy Bridge-H-2	0206A7h	J1	2	12	4 MB	LGA 1155, Socket G2, BGA-1023
Sandy Bridge-M-2	0206A7h	Q0	2	6	3 MB	LGA 1155, Socket G2, BGA-1023
Sandy Bridge-EP-8	0206D6h	C1	8	none	20 MB	LGA 2011
Sandy Bridge-EP-8	0206D7h	C2	8	none	20 MB	LGA 2011
Sandy Bridge-EP-4	0206D6h	M0	4	none	10 MB	LGA 2011
Sandy Bridge-EP-4	0206D7h	M1	4	none	10 MB	LGA 2011

== Performance ==
- The average performance increase, according to IXBT Labs and Semi Accurate as well as many other benchmarking sites, at clock to clock is 11.3% compared to the Nehalem generation, which includes Bloomfield, Clarkdale, and Lynnfield processors.
- Around twice the integrated graphics performance compared to Clarkdale's (12 EUs comparison).

== List of Sandy Bridge processors ==
^{1}Processors featuring Intel's HD 3000 graphics are set in bold. Other processors feature HD 2000 graphics, HD graphics (Pentium and Celeron models) or no graphics core (Graphics Clock rate indicated by N/A).

- This list may not contain all the Sandy Bridge processors released by Intel. A more complete listing can be found on Intel's website.

=== Desktop platform ===
Sandy Bridge-DT and Sandy Bridge-E
Processor branding and model		Cores (threads)	CPU clock rate		Graphics clock rate		L3 Cache	TDP	Release date (Y-M-D)	Price (USD)	Motherboard		
Processor branding and model		Cores (threads)	Normal	Turbo	Normal	Turbo	L3 Cache	TDP	Release date (Y-M-D)	Price (USD)	Socket	Interface	Memory
Core i7 Extreme	3970X^{[a]}	6 (12)	3.5 GHz	4.0 GHz	—N/a		15 MB	150 W	2012-11-12	$999	LGA; 2011	DMI 2.0; 40× PCIe 8 GT/s (Note: Shortly before Sandy Bridge-E's release, Intel decided not to claim its PCIe 3.0 support, because the lack of any PCIe 3.0-certified hardware at the time of release would make it difficult to validate compliance. However the ability to operate in the 3.0 mode was preserved, which was confirmed by media and acknowledged by Intel.)	Up to quad channel DDR3-1600
Core i7 Extreme	3960X^{[a]}	6 (12)	3.3 GHz	3.9 GHz	—N/a		15 MB	130 W	2011-11-14	$999	LGA; 2011	DMI 2.0; 40× PCIe 8 GT/s	Up to quad channel DDR3-1600
Core i7	3930K^{[a]}	6 (12)	3.2 GHz	3.8 GHz	—N/a		12 MB	130 W	2011-11-14	$583	LGA; 2011	DMI 2.0; 40× PCIe 8 GT/s	Up to quad channel DDR3-1600
Core i7	3820^{[a]}	4 (8)	3.6 GHz	3.8 GHz	—N/a		10 MB	130 W	2012-02-13	$294	LGA; 2011	DMI 2.0; 40× PCIe 8 GT/s	Up to quad channel DDR3-1600
Core i7	**2700K**	4 (8)	3.5 GHz	3.9 GHz	850 MHz	1350 MHz	8 MB	95 W	2011-10-24	$332	LGA; 1155	DMI 2.0; 16× PCIe 2.0	Up to dual channel DDR3-1333
Core i7	**2600K**	4 (8)	3.4 GHz	3.8 GHz	850 MHz	1350 MHz	8 MB	95 W	2011-01-09	$317	LGA; 1155	DMI 2.0; 16× PCIe 2.0	Up to dual channel DDR3-1333
Core i7	2600	4 (8)	3.4 GHz	3.8 GHz	850 MHz	1350 MHz	8 MB	95 W	2011-01-09	$294	LGA; 1155	DMI 2.0; 16× PCIe 2.0	Up to dual channel DDR3-1333
Core i7	2600S	4 (8)	2.8 GHz	3.8 GHz	850 MHz	1350 MHz	8 MB	65 W	2011-01-09	$306	LGA; 1155	DMI 2.0; 16× PCIe 2.0	Up to dual channel DDR3-1333
Core i5	2550K	4 (4)	3.4 GHz	3.8 GHz	—N/a		6 MB	95 W	2012-01-30	$225	LGA; 1155	DMI 2.0; 16× PCIe 2.0	Up to dual channel DDR3-1333
Core i5	**2500K**	4 (4)	3.3 GHz	3.7 GHz	850 MHz	1100 MHz	6 MB	95 W	2011-01-09	$216	LGA; 1155	DMI 2.0; 16× PCIe 2.0	Up to dual channel DDR3-1333
Core i5	2500	4 (4)	3.3 GHz	3.7 GHz	850 MHz	1100 MHz	6 MB	95 W	2011-01-09	$205	LGA; 1155	DMI 2.0; 16× PCIe 2.0	Up to dual channel DDR3-1333
Core i5	2500S	4 (4)	2.7 GHz	3.7 GHz	850 MHz	1100 MHz	6 MB	65 W	2011-01-09	$216	LGA; 1155	DMI 2.0; 16× PCIe 2.0	Up to dual channel DDR3-1333
Core i5	2500T	4 (4)	2.3 GHz	3.3 GHz	650 MHz	1250 MHz	6 MB	45 W	2011-01-09	$216	LGA; 1155	DMI 2.0; 16× PCIe 2.0	Up to dual channel DDR3-1333
Core i5	2450P	4 (4)	3.2 GHz	3.5 GHz	—N/a		6 MB	95 W	2012-01-30	$195	LGA; 1155	DMI 2.0; 16× PCIe 2.0	Up to dual channel DDR3-1333
Core i5	2400	4 (4)	3.1 GHz	3.4 GHz	850 MHz	1100 MHz	6 MB	95 W	2011-01-09	$184	LGA; 1155	DMI 2.0; 16× PCIe 2.0	Up to dual channel DDR3-1333
Core i5	**2405S**	4 (4)	2.5 GHz	3.3 GHz	850 MHz	1100 MHz	6 MB	65 W	2011-05-22	$205	LGA; 1155	DMI 2.0; 16× PCIe 2.0	Up to dual channel DDR3-1333
Core i5	2400S	4 (4)	2.5 GHz	3.3 GHz	850 MHz	1100 MHz	6 MB	65 W	2011-01-09	$195	LGA; 1155	DMI 2.0; 16× PCIe 2.0	Up to dual channel DDR3-1333
Core i5	2380P	4 (4)	3.1 GHz	3.4 GHz	—N/a		6 MB	95 W	2012-01-30	$177	LGA; 1155	DMI 2.0; 16× PCIe 2.0	Up to dual channel DDR3-1333
Core i5	2320	4 (4)	3.0 GHz	3.3 GHz	850 MHz	1100 MHz	6 MB	95 W	2011-09-04	$177	LGA; 1155	DMI 2.0; 16× PCIe 2.0	Up to dual channel DDR3-1333
Core i5	2310	4 (4)	2.9 GHz	3.2 GHz	850 MHz	1100 MHz	6 MB	95 W	2011-05-22	$177	LGA; 1155	DMI 2.0; 16× PCIe 2.0	Up to dual channel DDR3-1333
Core i5	2300	4 (4)	2.8 GHz	3.1 GHz	850 MHz	1100 MHz	6 MB	95 W	2011-01-09	$177	LGA; 1155	DMI 2.0; 16× PCIe 2.0	Up to dual channel DDR3-1333
Core i5	2390T	2 (4)	2.7 GHz	3.5 GHz	650 MHz	1100 MHz	3 MB	35 W	2011-02-20	$195	LGA; 1155	DMI 2.0; 16× PCIe 2.0	Up to dual channel DDR3-1333
Core i3	2120T	2 (4)	2.6 GHz	—N/a	650 MHz	1100 MHz	3 MB	35 W	2011-09-04	$127	LGA; 1155	DMI 2.0; 16× PCIe 2.0	Up to dual channel DDR3-1333
Core i3	2100T	2 (4)	2.5 GHz	—N/a	650 MHz	1100 MHz	3 MB	35 W	2011-02-20	$127	LGA; 1155	DMI 2.0; 16× PCIe 2.0	Up to dual channel DDR3-1333
Core i3	2115C	2 (4)	2.0 GHz	—N/a	—N/a		3 MB	25 W	2012-05	$241	BGA; 1284	DMI 2.0; 16× PCIe 2.0	Up to dual channel DDR3-1333
Core i3	2130	2 (4)	3.4 GHz	—N/a	850 MHz	1100 MHz	3 MB	65 W	2011-09-04	$138	LGA; 1155	DMI 2.0; 16× PCIe 2.0	Up to dual channel DDR3-1333
Core i3	**2125**	2 (4)	3.3 GHz	—N/a	850 MHz	1100 MHz	3 MB	65 W	2011-09-04	$134	LGA; 1155	DMI 2.0; 16× PCIe 2.0	Up to dual channel DDR3-1333
Core i3	2120	2 (4)	3.3 GHz	—N/a	850 MHz	1100 MHz	3 MB	65 W	2011-02-20	$138	LGA; 1155	DMI 2.0; 16× PCIe 2.0	Up to dual channel DDR3-1333
Core i3	**2105**	2 (4)	3.1 GHz	—N/a	850 MHz	1100 MHz	3 MB	65 W	2011-05-22	$134	LGA; 1155	DMI 2.0; 16× PCIe 2.0	Up to dual channel DDR3-1333
Core i3	2102	2 (4)	3.1 GHz	—N/a	850 MHz	1100 MHz	3 MB	65 W	Q2 2011	$127	LGA; 1155	DMI 2.0; 16× PCIe 2.0	Up to dual channel DDR3-1333
Core i3	2100	2 (4)	3.1 GHz	—N/a	850 MHz	1100 MHz	3 MB	65 W	2011-02-20	$117	LGA; 1155	DMI 2.0; 16× PCIe 2.0	Up to dual channel DDR3-1333
Pentium	G870	2 (2)	3.1 GHz	—N/a	850 MHz	1100 MHz	3 MB	65 W	2012-06-03	$86	LGA; 1155	DMI 2.0; 16× PCIe 2.0	Up to dual channel DDR3-1333
Pentium	G860	2 (2)	3.0 GHz	—N/a	850 MHz	1100 MHz	3 MB	65 W	2011-09-04	$86	LGA; 1155	DMI 2.0; 16× PCIe 2.0	Up to dual channel DDR3-1333
Pentium	G860T	2 (2)	2.6 GHz	—N/a	650 MHz	1100 MHz	3 MB	35 W	2012-06-03	$75	LGA; 1155	DMI 2.0; 16× PCIe 2.0	Up to dual channel DDR3-1333
Pentium	G850	2 (2)	2.9 GHz	—N/a	850 MHz	1100 MHz	3 MB	65 W	2011-05-24	$86	LGA; 1155	DMI 2.0; 16× PCIe 2.0	Up to dual channel DDR3-1333
Pentium	G840	2 (2)	2.8 GHz	—N/a	850 MHz	1100 MHz	3 MB	65 W	2011-05-24	$75	LGA; 1155	DMI 2.0; 16× PCIe 2.0	Up to dual channel DDR3-1333
Pentium	G645	2 (2)	2.9 GHz	—N/a	850 MHz	1100 MHz	3 MB	65 W	2012-09-03	$64	LGA; 1155	DMI 2.0; 16× PCIe 2.0	Up to dual channel DDR3-1066
Pentium	G640	2 (2)	2.8 GHz	—N/a	850 MHz	1100 MHz	3 MB	65 W	2012-06-03	$64	LGA; 1155	DMI 2.0; 16× PCIe 2.0	Up to dual channel DDR3-1066
Pentium	G632	2 (2)	2.7 GHz	—N/a	850 MHz	1100 MHz	3 MB	65 W	Q3 2011		LGA; 1155	DMI 2.0; 16× PCIe 2.0	Up to dual channel DDR3-1066
Pentium	G630	2 (2)	2.7 GHz	—N/a	850 MHz	1100 MHz	3 MB	65 W	2011-09-04	$75	LGA; 1155	DMI 2.0; 16× PCIe 2.0	Up to dual channel DDR3-1066
Pentium	G622	2 (2)	2.6 GHz	—N/a	850 MHz	1100 MHz	3 MB	65 W	Q2 2011		LGA; 1155	DMI 2.0; 16× PCIe 2.0	Up to dual channel DDR3-1066
Pentium	G620	2 (2)	2.6 GHz	—N/a	850 MHz	1100 MHz	3 MB	65 W	2011-05-24	$64	LGA; 1155	DMI 2.0; 16× PCIe 2.0	Up to dual channel DDR3-1066
Pentium	G645T	2 (2)	2.5 GHz	—N/a	650 MHz	1100 MHz	3 MB	35 W	2012-09-03	$64	LGA; 1155	DMI 2.0; 16× PCIe 2.0	Up to dual channel DDR3-1066
Pentium	G640T	2 (2)	2.4 GHz	—N/a	650 MHz	1100 MHz	3 MB	35 W	2012-06-03	$64	LGA; 1155	DMI 2.0; 16× PCIe 2.0	Up to dual channel DDR3-1066
Pentium	G630T	2 (2)	2.3 GHz	—N/a	650 MHz	1100 MHz	3 MB	35 W	2011-09-04	$70	LGA; 1155	DMI 2.0; 16× PCIe 2.0	Up to dual channel DDR3-1066
Pentium	G620T	2 (2)	2.2 GHz	—N/a	650 MHz	1100 MHz	3 MB	35 W	2011-05-24	$70	LGA; 1155	DMI 2.0; 16× PCIe 2.0	Up to dual channel DDR3-1066
Celeron	G555	2 (2)	2.7 GHz	—N/a	850 MHz	1000 MHz	2 MB	65 W	2012-09-02	$52	LGA; 1155	DMI 2.0; 16× PCIe 2.0	Up to dual channel DDR3-1066
Celeron	G550	2 (2)	2.6 GHz	—N/a	850 MHz	1000 MHz	2 MB	65 W	2012-06-03	$52	LGA; 1155	DMI 2.0; 16× PCIe 2.0	Up to dual channel DDR3-1066
Celeron	G540	2 (2)	2.5 GHz	—N/a	850 MHz	1000 MHz	2 MB	65 W	2011-09-04	$52	LGA; 1155	DMI 2.0; 16× PCIe 2.0	Up to dual channel DDR3-1066
Celeron	G530	2 (2)	2.4 GHz	—N/a	850 MHz	1000 MHz	2 MB	65 W	2011-09-04	$42	LGA; 1155	DMI 2.0; 16× PCIe 2.0	Up to dual channel DDR3-1066
Celeron	G550T	2 (2)	2.2 GHz	—N/a	650 MHz	1000 MHz	2 MB	35 W	2012-09-02	$42	LGA; 1155	DMI 2.0; 16× PCIe 2.0	Up to dual channel DDR3-1066
Celeron	G540T	2 (2)	2.1 GHz	—N/a	650 MHz	1000 MHz	2 MB	35 W	2012-06-03	$42	LGA; 1155	DMI 2.0; 16× PCIe 2.0	Up to dual channel DDR3-1066
Celeron	G530T	2 (2)	2.0 GHz	—N/a	650 MHz	1000 MHz	2 MB	35 W	2011-09-04	$47	LGA; 1155	DMI 2.0; 16× PCIe 2.0	Up to dual channel DDR3-1066
Celeron	G470	1 (2)	2.0 GHz	—N/a	650 MHz	1000 MHz	1.5 MB	35 W	2013-06-09	$37	LGA; 1155	DMI 2.0; 16× PCIe 2.0	Up to dual channel DDR3-1333
Celeron	G465	1 (2)	1.9 GHz	—N/a	650 MHz	1000 MHz	1.5 MB	35 W	2012-09-02	$37	LGA; 1155	DMI 2.0; 16× PCIe 2.0	Up to dual channel DDR3-1066
Celeron	G460	1 (2)	1.8 GHz	—N/a	650 MHz	1000 MHz	1.5 MB	35 W	2011-12-11	$37	LGA; 1155	DMI 2.0; 16× PCIe 2.0	Up to dual channel DDR3-1066
Celeron	G440	1 (1)	1.6 GHz	—N/a	650 MHz	1000 MHz	1 MB	35 W	2011-09-04	$37	LGA; 1155	DMI 2.0; 16× PCIe 2.0	Up to dual channel DDR3-1066

Suffixes to denote:

- K – Unlocked (adjustable CPU ratio up to 57 bins)
- P – Versions clocked slightly higher than similar models, but with onboard-graphics deactivated
- S – Performance-optimized lifestyle (low power with 65W TDP)
- T – Power-optimized lifestyle (ultra low power with 35-45W TDP)
- X – Extreme performance and unlocked (adjustable CPU ratio with no ratio limit)
- C – Embedded/Communications - BGA packaging

^{a} Note: Released as third-generation Sandy Bridge-E high-end desktop processors.

=== Server platform ===
All 1600/2600/4600-series models:

- support 40 PCI Express 3.0 lanes
- support DMI 2.0
- support LGA 2011 as a socket with varying scalabilities

Sandy Bridge-EP Xeon E5-1600/2600/4600
Model		Cores (threads)	L3 Cache	CPU clock rate		Interfaces		Supported memory	TDP	Release date	Price (USD)
Model		Cores (threads)	L3 Cache	Base	Turbo	Scalability	QPI	Supported memory	TDP	Release date	Price (USD)
Xeon E5 4S	4650	8 (16)	20 MB	2.7 GHz	3.3 GHz	4 sockets (4S)	2× 8.0 GT/s	4× DDR3-1600	130 W	May 14, 2012	$3616
Xeon E5 4S	4650L	8 (16)	20 MB	2.6 GHz	3.1 GHz	4 sockets (4S)	2× 8.0 GT/s	4× DDR3-1600	115 W	May 14, 2012	$3616
Xeon E5 4S	4640	8 (16)	20 MB	2.4 GHz	2.8 GHz	4 sockets (4S)	2× 8.0 GT/s	4× DDR3-1600	95 W	May 14, 2012	$2725
Xeon E5 4S	4620	8 (16)	16 MB	2.2 GHz	2.6 GHz	4 sockets (4S)	2× 7.2 GT/s	4× DDR3-1333	95 W	May 14, 2012	$1611
Xeon E5 4S	4617	6 (6)	15 MB	2.9 GHz	3.4 GHz	4 sockets (4S)	2× 7.2 GT/s	4× DDR3-1600	130 W	May 14, 2012	$1611
Xeon E5 4S	4610	6 (12)	15 MB	2.4 GHz	2.9 GHz	4 sockets (4S)	2× 7.2 GT/s	4× DDR3-1333	95 W	May 14, 2012	$1219
Xeon E5 4S	4607	6 (12)	12 MB	2.2 GHz	N/A	4 sockets (4S)	2× 6.0 GT/s	4× DDR3-1066	95 W	May 14, 2012	$885
Xeon E5 4S	4603	4 (8)	10 MB	2.0 GHz	N/A	4 sockets (4S)	2× 6.0 GT/s	4× DDR3-1066	95 W	May 14, 2012	$551
Xeon E5 2S	2687W	8 (16)	20 MB	3.1 GHz	3.8 GHz	2 sockets (2S)	2× 8.0 GT/s	4× DDR3-1600	150 W	March 6, 2012	$1885
Xeon E5 2S	2690	8 (16)	20 MB	2.9 GHz	3.8 GHz	2 sockets (2S)	2× 8.0 GT/s	4× DDR3-1600	135 W	March 6, 2012	$2057
Xeon E5 2S	2680	8 (16)	20 MB	2.7 GHz	3.5 GHz	2 sockets (2S)	2× 8.0 GT/s	4× DDR3-1600	130 W	March 6, 2012	$1723
Xeon E5 2S	2689	8 (16)	20 MB	2.6 GHz	3.6 GHz	2 sockets (2S)	2× 8.0 GT/s	4× DDR3-1600	115 W	March 6, 2012	OEM
Xeon E5 2S	2670	8 (16)	20 MB	2.6 GHz	3.3 GHz	2 sockets (2S)	2× 8.0 GT/s	4× DDR3-1600	115 W	March 6, 2012	$1552
Xeon E5 2S	2665	8 (16)	20 MB	2.4 GHz	3.1 GHz	2 sockets (2S)	2× 8.0 GT/s	4× DDR3-1600	115 W	March 6, 2012	$1440
Xeon E5 2S	2660	8 (16)	20 MB	2.2 GHz	3.0 GHz	2 sockets (2S)	2× 8.0 GT/s	4× DDR3-1600	95 W	March 6, 2012	$1329
Xeon E5 2S	2658	8 (16)	20 MB	2.1 GHz	2.4 GHz	2 sockets (2S)	2× 8.0 GT/s	4× DDR3-1600	95 W	March 6, 2012	$1186
Xeon E5 2S	2650	8 (16)	20 MB	2.0 GHz	2.8 GHz	2 sockets (2S)	2× 8.0 GT/s	4× DDR3-1600	95 W	March 6, 2012	$1107
Xeon E5 2S	2650L	8 (16)	20 MB	1.8 GHz	2.3 GHz	2 sockets (2S)	2× 8.0 GT/s	4× DDR3-1600	70 W	March 6, 2012	$1107
Xeon E5 2S	2648L	8 (16)	20 MB	1.8 GHz	2.1 GHz	2 sockets (2S)	2× 8.0 GT/s	4× DDR3-1600	70 W	March 6, 2012	$1186
Xeon E5 2S	2667	6 (12)	15MB	2.9 GHz	3.5 GHz	2 sockets (2S)	2× 8.0 GT/s	4× DDR3-1600	130 W	March 6, 2012	$1552
Xeon E5 2S	2640	6 (12)	15MB	2.5 GHz	3.0 GHz	2 sockets (2S)	2× 7.2 GT/s	4× DDR3-1333	95 W	March 6, 2012	$884
Xeon E5 2S	2630	6 (12)	15MB	2.3 GHz	2.8 GHz	2 sockets (2S)	2× 7.2 GT/s	4× DDR3-1333	95 W	March 6, 2012	$612
Xeon E5 2S	2620	6 (12)	15MB	2.0 GHz	2.5 GHz	2 sockets (2S)	2× 7.2 GT/s	4× DDR3-1333	95 W	March 6, 2012	$406
Xeon E5 2S	2630L	6 (12)	15MB	2.0 GHz	2.5 GHz	2 sockets (2S)	2× 7.2 GT/s	4× DDR3-1333	60 W	March 6, 2012	$662
Xeon E5 2S	2628L	6 (12)	15MB	1.8 GHz	N/A	2 sockets (2S)	2× 7.2 GT/s	4× DDR3-1333	60 W	July 22, 2013	OEM
Xeon E5 2S	2643	4 (8)	10MB	3.3 GHz	3.5 GHz	2 sockets (2S)	2× 8.0 GT/s	4× DDR3-1600	130 W	March 6, 2012	$884
Xeon E5 2S	2637	2 (4)	5MB	3.0 GHz	3.5 GHz	2 sockets (2S)	2× 8.0 GT/s	4× DDR3-1600	80 W	March 6, 2012	$884
Xeon E5 2S	2618L	4 (8)	10MB	1.8 GHz	N/A	2 sockets (2S)	2× 6.4 GT/s	4× DDR3-1333	50 W	July 22, 2013	OEM
Xeon E5 2S	2609	4 (4)	10MB	2.4 GHz	N/A	2 sockets (2S)	2× 6.4 GT/s	4× DDR3-1066	80 W	March 6, 2012	$246
Xeon E5 2S	2603	4 (4)	10MB	1.8 GHz	N/A	2 sockets (2S)	2× 6.4 GT/s	4× DDR3-1066	80 W	March 6, 2012	$202
Xeon E5 1S	1660	6 (12)	15MB	3.3 GHz	3.9 GHz	1 socket (1S)	N/A	4× DDR3-1600	130 W	March 6, 2012	$1080
Xeon E5 1S	1650	6 (12)	12MB	3.2 GHz	3.8 GHz	1 socket (1S)	N/A	4× DDR3-1600	130 W	March 6, 2012	$583
Xeon E5 1S	1620	4 (8)	10MB	3.6 GHz	3.8 GHz	1 socket (1S)	N/A	4× DDR3-1600	130 W	March 6, 2012	$294
Xeon E5 1S	1607	4 (4)	10MB	3.0 GHz	N/A	1 socket (1S)	N/A	4× DDR3-1066	130 W	March 6, 2012	$244
Xeon E5 1S	1603	4 (4)	10MB	2.8 GHz	N/A	1 socket (1S)	N/A	4× DDR3-1066	130 W	March 6, 2012	$198

Suffixes to denote:

- L – Low power
- W – Optimized for workstations

Sandy Bridge-EN Xeon E5-1400/2400
Socket	Model		Cores (threads)	L3 Cache	CPU clock rate		Interface	Supported memory	TDP	Release date	Price (USD)
Socket	Model		Cores (threads)	L3 Cache	Base	Turbo	Interface	Supported memory	TDP	Release date	Price (USD)
LGA 1356 Dual Socket	Xeon E5	2470	8 (16)	20MB	2.3 GHz	3.1 GHz	1× QPI DMI 2.0 24× PCI-E 3.0	3× DDR3-1600	95 W	May 14, 2012	$1440
LGA 1356 Dual Socket	Xeon E5	2450	8 (16)	20MB	2.1 GHz	2.9 GHz	1× QPI DMI 2.0 24× PCI-E 3.0	3× DDR3-1600	95 W	May 14, 2012	$1106
LGA 1356 Dual Socket	Xeon E5	2450L	8 (16)	20MB	1.8 GHz	2.3 GHz	1× QPI DMI 2.0 24× PCI-E 3.0	3× DDR3-1600	70 W	May 14, 2012	$1106
LGA 1356 Dual Socket	Xeon E5	2448L	8 (16)	20MB	1.8 GHz	2.1 GHz	1× QPI DMI 2.0 24× PCI-E 3.0	3× DDR3-1600	70 W	May 14, 2012	$1151
LGA 1356 Dual Socket	Xeon E5	2449L	8 (16)	20MB	1.4 GHz	1.8 GHz	1× QPI DMI 2.0 24× PCI-E 3.0	3× DDR3-1600	50 W	May 14, 2012	OEM
LGA 1356 Dual Socket	Xeon E5	2440	6 (12)	15MB	2.4 GHz	2.9 GHz	1× QPI DMI 2.0 24× PCI-E 3.0	3× DDR3-1333	95 W	May 14, 2012	$834
LGA 1356 Dual Socket	Xeon E5	2430	6 (12)	15MB	2.2 GHz	2.7 GHz	1× QPI DMI 2.0 24× PCI-E 3.0	3× DDR3-1333	95 W	May 14, 2012	$551
LGA 1356 Dual Socket	Xeon E5	2420	6 (12)	15MB	1.9 GHz	2.4 GHz	1× QPI DMI 2.0 24× PCI-E 3.0	3× DDR3-1333	95 W	May 14, 2012	$388
LGA 1356 Dual Socket	Xeon E5	2430L	6 (12)	15MB	2.0 GHz	2.5 GHz	1× QPI DMI 2.0 24× PCI-E 3.0	3× DDR3-1333	60 W	May 14, 2012	$662
LGA 1356 Dual Socket	Xeon E5	2428L	6 (12)	15MB	1.8 GHz	2.0 GHz	1× QPI DMI 2.0 24× PCI-E 3.0	3× DDR3-1333	60 W	May 14, 2012	$628
LGA 1356 Dual Socket	Xeon E5	2418L	4 (8)	10MB	2.0 GHz	2.1 GHz	1× QPI DMI 2.0 24× PCI-E 3.0	3× DDR3-1333	50 W	May 14, 2012	$387
LGA 1356 Dual Socket	Xeon E5	2407	4 (4)	10MB	2.2 GHz	N/A	1× QPI DMI 2.0 24× PCI-E 3.0	3× DDR3-1066	80 W	May 14, 2012	$250
LGA 1356 Dual Socket	Xeon E5	2403	4 (4)	10MB	1.8 GHz	N/A	1× QPI DMI 2.0 24× PCI-E 3.0	3× DDR3-1066	80 W	May 14, 2012	$192
LGA 1356	Xeon E5	1428L	6 (12)	15MB	1.8 GHz	N/A	1× QPI DMI 2.0 24× PCI-E 3.0	3× DDR3-1333	60 W	May 14, 2012	$395
LGA 1356	Xeon E5	1410	4 (8)	10MB	2.8 GHz	3.2 GHz	1× QPI DMI 2.0 24× PCI-E 3.0	3× DDR3-1333	80 W	May 14, 2012	N/A
LGA 1356	Pentium	1407	2 (2)	5MB	2.8 GHz	N/A	1× QPI DMI 2.0 24× PCI-E 3.0	3× DDR3-1066	80 W	May 14, 2012	N/A
LGA 1356	Pentium	1403	2 (2)	5MB	2.6 GHz	N/A	1× QPI DMI 2.0 24× PCI-E 3.0	3× DDR3-1066	80 W	May 14, 2012	N/A
LGA 1356	Pentium	1405	2 (2)	5MB	1.2 GHz	1.8 GHz	1× QPI DMI 2.0 24× PCI-E 3.0	3× DDR3-1066	40 W	2012-08	$143

Sandy Bridge-DT Xeon E3-1200
Socket	Model		Cores (threads)	CPU clock rate		L3 cache	Integrated graphics	Interface	Supported memory	TDP	Release date	Price (USD)
Socket	Model		Cores (threads)	Base	Turbo	L3 cache	Integrated graphics	Interface	Supported memory	TDP	Release date	Price (USD)
LGA 1155	Xeon E3	1290	4 (8)	3.6 GHz	4.0 GHz	8MB	N/A	DMI 2.0 20× PCIe 2.0	2× DDR3-1333	95 W	May 29, 2011	$885
LGA 1155	Xeon E3	1280	4 (8)	3.5 GHz	3.9 GHz	8MB	N/A	DMI 2.0 20× PCIe 2.0	2× DDR3-1333	95 W	April 3, 2011	$612
LGA 1155	Xeon E3	1270	4 (8)	3.4 GHz	3.8 GHz	8MB	N/A	DMI 2.0 20× PCIe 2.0	2× DDR3-1333	80 W	April 3, 2011	$328
LGA 1155	Xeon E3	1240	4 (8)	3.3 GHz	3.7 GHz	8MB	N/A	DMI 2.0 20× PCIe 2.0	2× DDR3-1333	80 W	April 3, 2011	$250
LGA 1155	Xeon E3	1230	4 (8)	3.2 GHz	3.6 GHz	8MB	N/A	DMI 2.0 20× PCIe 2.0	2× DDR3-1333	80 W	April 3, 2011	$215
LGA 1155	Xeon E3	1220	4 (4)	3.1 GHz	3.4 GHz	8MB	N/A	DMI 2.0 20× PCIe 2.0	2× DDR3-1333	80 W	April 3, 2011	$189
LGA 1155	Xeon E3	1220L	2 (4)	2.2 GHz	3.4 GHz	3MB	N/A	DMI 2.0 20× PCIe 2.0	2× DDR3-1333	20 W	April 3, 2011	$189
LGA 1155	Xeon E3	1275	4 (8)	3.4 GHz	3.8 GHz	8MB	HD Graphics P3000	DMI 2.0 20× PCIe 2.0	2× DDR3-1333	95 W	April 3, 2011	$339
LGA 1155	Xeon E3	1245	4 (8)	3.3 GHz	3.7 GHz	8MB	HD Graphics P3000	DMI 2.0 20× PCIe 2.0	2× DDR3-1333	95 W	April 3, 2011	$262
LGA 1155	Xeon E3	1235	4 (8)	3.2 GHz	3.6 GHz	8MB	HD Graphics P3000	DMI 2.0 20× PCIe 2.0	2× DDR3-1333	95 W	April 3, 2011	$240
LGA 1155	Xeon E3	1225	4 (4)	3.1 GHz	3.4 GHz	6MB	HD Graphics P3000	DMI 2.0 20× PCIe 2.0	2× DDR3-1333	95 W	April 3, 2011	$194
LGA 1155	Xeon E3	1265L	4 (8)	2.4 GHz	3.3 GHz	8MB	HD Graphics P3000	DMI 2.0 20× PCIe 2.0	2× DDR3-1333	45 W	April 3, 2011	OEM
LGA 1155	Xeon E3	1260L	4 (8)	2.4 GHz	3.3 GHz	8MB	HD Graphics 2000	DMI 2.0 20× PCIe 2.0	2× DDR3-1333	45 W	April 3, 2011	$294

=== Mobile platform ===
- Core i5-2515E and Core i7-2715QE processors have support for ECC memory and PCI express port bifurcation.
- All mobile processors, except Celeron and Pentium, use the HD 3000 (12 EUs) iGPU.

Target segment	Processor branding and model		Cores / threads	CPU clock rate		Graphics clock rate		L3 cache	TDP	Release date	Price (USD)	Motherboard	
Target segment	Processor branding and model		Cores / threads	Base	Turbo (1C/2C/4C)	Base	Turbo	L3 cache	TDP	Release date	Price (USD)	Interface	Socket
Extreme	Core i7 Extreme	2960XM	4 (8)	2.7 GHz	3.7/3.6/3.4 GHz	650 MHz	1300 MHz	8 MB	55 W	2011-09-04	$1096	*DMI 2.0; *Memory: Up to dual channel DDR3-1600 MT/s; *PCIe 2.0	Socket G2 / BGA-1224
Extreme	Core i7 Extreme	2920XM	4 (8)	2.5 GHz	3.5/3.4/3.2 GHz	650 MHz	1300 MHz	8 MB	55 W	2011-01-05	$1096	*DMI 2.0; *Memory: Up to dual channel DDR3-1600 MT/s; *PCIe 2.0	Socket G2 / BGA-1224
Performance	Core i7	2860QM	4 (8)	2.5 GHz	3.6/3.5/3.3 GHz	650 MHz	1300 MHz	8 MB	45 W	2011-09-04	$568	*DMI 2.0; *Memory: Up to dual channel DDR3-1600 MT/s; *PCIe 2.0	Socket G2 / BGA-1224
Performance	Core i7	2820QM	4 (8)	2.3 GHz	3.4/3.3/3.1 GHz	650 MHz	1300 MHz	8 MB	45 W	2011-01-05	$568	*DMI 2.0; *Memory: Up to dual channel DDR3-1600 MT/s; *PCIe 2.0	Socket G2 / BGA-1224
Performance	Core i7	2760QM	4 (8)	2.4 GHz	3.5/3.4/3.2 GHz	650 MHz	1300 MHz	6 MB	45 W	2011-09-04	$378	*DMI 2.0; *Memory: Up to dual channel DDR3-1600 MT/s; *PCIe 2.0	Socket G2 / BGA-1224
Performance	Core i7	2720QM	4 (8)	2.2 GHz	3.3/3.2/3.0 GHz	650 MHz	1300 MHz	6 MB	45 W	2011-01-05	$378	*DMI 2.0; *Memory: Up to dual channel DDR3-1600 MT/s; *PCIe 2.0	Socket G2 / BGA-1224
Performance	Core i7	2715QE	4 (8)	2.1 GHz	3.0/2.9/2.7 GHz	650 MHz	1200 MHz	6 MB	45 W	2011-01-05	$378	*DMI 2.0; *Memory: Up to dual channel DDR3-1600 MT/s; *PCIe 2.0	Socket G2 / BGA-1224
Performance	Core i7	2710QE	4 (8)	2.1 GHz	3.0/2.9/2.7 GHz	650 MHz	1200 MHz	6 MB	45 W	2011-01-05	$378	*DMI 2.0; *Memory: Up to dual channel DDR3-1600 MT/s; *PCIe 2.0	Socket G2 / BGA-1224
Performance	Core i7	2675QM	4 (8)	2.2 GHz	3.1/3.0/2.8 GHz	650 MHz	1200 MHz	6 MB	45 W	2011-10-02	$378	*DMI 2.0; *Memory: Up to dual channel DDR3-1333 MHz; *PCIe 2.0	Socket G2 / BGA-1224
Performance	Core i7	2670QM	4 (8)	2.2 GHz	3.1/3.0/2.8 GHz	650 MHz	1100 MHz	6 MB	45 W	2011-10-02	$378	*DMI 2.0; *Memory: Up to dual channel DDR3-1333 MHz; *PCIe 2.0	Socket G2 / BGA-1224
Performance	Core i7	2635QM	4 (8)	2.0 GHz	2.9/2.8/2.6 GHz	650 MHz	1200 MHz	6 MB	45 W	2011-01-05	$378	*DMI 2.0; *Memory: Up to dual channel DDR3-1333 MHz; *PCIe 2.0	Socket G2 / BGA-1224
Performance	Core i7	2630QM	4 (8)	2.0 GHz	2.9/2.8/2.6 GHz	650 MHz	1100 MHz	6 MB	45 W	2011-01-05	$378	*DMI 2.0; *Memory: Up to dual channel DDR3-1333 MHz; *PCIe 2.0	Socket G2 / BGA-1224
Mainstream	Core i7	2640M	2 (4)	2.8 GHz	3.5/3.3 GHz	650 MHz	1300 MHz	4 MB	35 W	2011-09-04	$346	*DMI 2.0; *Memory: Up to dual channel DDR3-1333 MHz; *PCIe 2.0	Socket G2 / BGA-1023 (in low power and embedded products)
Mainstream	Core i7	2620M	2 (4)	2.7 GHz	3.4/3.2 GHz	650 MHz	1300 MHz	4 MB	35 W	2011-02-20	$346	*DMI 2.0; *Memory: Up to dual channel DDR3-1333 MHz; *PCIe 2.0	Socket G2 / BGA-1023 (in low power and embedded products)
Mainstream	Core i7	2649M	2 (4)	2.3 GHz	3.2/2.9 GHz	500 MHz	1100 MHz	4 MB	25 W	2011-02-20	$346	*DMI 2.0; *Memory: Up to dual channel DDR3-1333 MHz; *PCIe 2.0	Socket G2 / BGA-1023 (in low power and embedded products)
Mainstream	Core i7	2629M	2 (4)	2.1 GHz	3.0/2.7 GHz	500 MHz	1100 MHz	4 MB	25 W	2011-02-20	$311	*DMI 2.0; *Memory: Up to dual channel DDR3-1333 MHz; *PCIe 2.0	Socket G2 / BGA-1023 (in low power and embedded products)
Mainstream	Core i7	2655LE	2 (4)	2.2 GHz	2.9/2.7 GHz	650 MHz	1000 MHz	4 MB	25 W	2011-02-20	$346	*DMI 2.0; *Memory: Up to dual channel DDR3-1333 MHz; *PCIe 2.0	Socket G2 / BGA-1023 (in low power and embedded products)
Mainstream	Core i7	2677M	2 (4)	1.8 GHz	2.9/2.6 GHz	350 MHz	1200 MHz	4 MB	17 W	2011-06-20	$317	*DMI 2.0; *Memory: Up to dual channel DDR3-1333 MHz; *PCIe 2.0	Socket G2 / BGA-1023 (in low power and embedded products)
Mainstream	Core i7	2637M	2 (4)	1.7 GHz	2.8/2.5 GHz	350 MHz	1200 MHz	4 MB	17 W	2011-06-20	$289	*DMI 2.0; *Memory: Up to dual channel DDR3-1333 MHz; *PCIe 2.0	Socket G2 / BGA-1023 (in low power and embedded products)
Mainstream	Core i7	2657M	2 (4)	1.6 GHz	2.7/2.4 GHz	350 MHz	1000 MHz	4 MB	17 W	2011-02-20	$317	*DMI 2.0; *Memory: Up to dual channel DDR3-1333 MHz; *PCIe 2.0	Socket G2 / BGA-1023 (in low power and embedded products)
Mainstream	Core i7	2617M	2 (4)	1.5 GHz	2.6/2.3 GHz	350 MHz	950 MHz	4 MB	17 W	2011-02-20	$289	*DMI 2.0; *Memory: Up to dual channel DDR3-1333 MHz; *PCIe 2.0	Socket G2 / BGA-1023 (in low power and embedded products)
Mainstream	Core i7	2610UE	2 (4)	1.5 GHz	2.4/2.1 GHz	350 MHz	850 MHz	4 MB	17 W	2011-02-20	$317	*DMI 2.0; *Memory: Up to dual channel DDR3-1333 MHz; *PCIe 2.0	Socket G2 / BGA-1023 (in low power and embedded products)
Mainstream	Core i5	2557M	2 (4)	1.7 GHz	2.7/2.4 GHz	350 MHz	1200 MHz	3 MB	17 W	2011-06-20	$250	*DMI 2.0; *Memory: Up to dual channel DDR3-1333 MHz; *PCIe 2.0	Socket G2 / BGA-1023 (in low power and embedded products)
Mainstream	Core i5	2537M	2 (4)	1.4 GHz	2.3/2.0 GHz	350 MHz	900 MHz	3 MB	17 W	2011-02-20	$250	*DMI 2.0; *Memory: Up to dual channel DDR3-1333 MHz; *PCIe 2.0	Socket G2 / BGA-1023 (in low power and embedded products)
Mainstream	Core i5	2467M	2 (4)	1.6 GHz	2.3/2.0 GHz	350 MHz	1150 MHz	3 MB	17 W	2011-06-19	$250	*DMI 2.0; *Memory: Up to dual channel DDR3-1333 MHz; *PCIe 2.0	Socket G2 / BGA-1023 (in low power and embedded products)
Mainstream	Core i5	2540M	2 (4)	2.6 GHz	3.3/3.1 GHz	650 MHz	1300 MHz	3 MB	35 W	2011-06-20	$266	*DMI 2.0; *Memory: Up to dual channel DDR3-1333 MHz; *PCIe 2.0	Socket G2 / BGA-1023 (in low power and embedded products)
Mainstream	Core i5	2520M	2 (4)	2.5 GHz	3.2/3.0 GHz	650 MHz	1300 MHz	3 MB	35 W	2011-06-20	$225	*DMI 2.0; *Memory: Up to dual channel DDR3-1333 MHz; *PCIe 2.0	Socket G2 / BGA-1023 (in low power and embedded products)
Mainstream	Core i5	2515E	2 (4)	2.5 GHz	3.1/2.8 GHz	650 MHz	1100 MHz	3 MB	35 W	2011-06-20	$266	*DMI 2.0; *Memory: Up to dual channel DDR3-1333 MHz; *PCIe 2.0	Socket G2 / BGA-1023 (in low power and embedded products)
Mainstream	Core i5	2510E	2 (4)	2.5 GHz	3.1/2.8 GHz	650 MHz	1100 MHz	3 MB	35 W	2011-06-20	$266	*DMI 2.0; *Memory: Up to dual channel DDR3-1333 MHz; *PCIe 2.0	Socket G2 / BGA-1023 (in low power and embedded products)
Mainstream	Core i5	2450M	2 (4)	2.5 GHz	3.1/2.8 GHz	650 MHz	1300 MHz	3 MB	35 W	2012-01	$225	*DMI 2.0; *Memory: Up to dual channel DDR3-1333 MHz; *PCIe 2.0	Socket G2 / BGA-1023 (in low power and embedded products)
Mainstream	Core i5	2435M	2 (4)	2.4 GHz	3.0/2.7 GHz	650 MHz	1300 MHz	3 MB	35 W	2011-10-02	OEM	*DMI 2.0; *Memory: Up to dual channel DDR3-1333 MHz; *PCIe 2.0	Socket G2 / BGA-1023 (in low power and embedded products)
Mainstream	Core i5	2430M	2 (4)	2.4 GHz	3.0/2.7 GHz	650 MHz	1200 MHz	3 MB	35 W	2011-10-02	$225	*DMI 2.0; *Memory: Up to dual channel DDR3-1333 MHz; *PCIe 2.0	Socket G2 / BGA-1023 (in low power and embedded products)
Mainstream	Core i5	2410M	2 (4)	2.3 GHz	2.9/2.6 GHz	650 MHz	1200 MHz	3 MB	35 W	2011-06-20	$225	*DMI 2.0; *Memory: Up to dual channel DDR3-1333 MHz; *PCIe 2.0	Socket G2 / BGA-1023 (in low power and embedded products)
Mainstream	Core i3	2370M	2 (4)	2.4 GHz	—N/a	650 MHz	1150 MHz	3 MB	35 W	2012-01	$225	*DMI 2.0; *Memory: Up to dual channel DDR3-1333 MHz; *PCIe 2.0	Socket G2 / BGA-1023 (in low power and embedded products)
Mainstream	Core i3	2350M	2 (4)	2.3 GHz	—N/a	650 MHz	1150 MHz	3 MB	35 W	2011-10-02	$225	*DMI 2.0; *Memory: Up to dual channel DDR3-1333 MHz; *PCIe 2.0	Socket G2 / BGA-1023 (in low power and embedded products)
Mainstream	Core i3	2348M	2 (4)	2.3 GHz	—N/a	650 MHz	1150 MHz	3 MB	35 W	2013-01	OEM	*DMI 2.0; *Memory: Up to dual channel DDR3-1333 MHz; *PCIe 2.0	Socket G2 / BGA-1023 (in low power and embedded products)
Mainstream	Core i3	2330E	2 (4)	2.2 GHz	—N/a	650 MHz	1050 MHz	3 MB	35 W	2011-06-19	$225	*DMI 2.0; *Memory: Up to dual channel DDR3-1333 MHz; *PCIe 2.0	Socket G2 / BGA-1023 (in low power and embedded products)
Mainstream	Core i3	2330M	2 (4)	2.2 GHz	—N/a	650 MHz	1100 MHz	3 MB	35 W	2011-06-19	$225	*DMI 2.0; *Memory: Up to dual channel DDR3-1333 MHz; *PCIe 2.0	Socket G2 / BGA-1023 (in low power and embedded products)
Mainstream	Core i3	2328M	2 (4)	2.2 GHz	—N/a	650 MHz	1100 MHz	3 MB	35 W	2012-09	$225	*DMI 2.0; *Memory: Up to dual channel DDR3-1333 MHz; *PCIe 2.0	Socket G2 / BGA-1023 (in low power and embedded products)
Mainstream	Core i3	2312M	2 (4)	2.1 GHz	—N/a	650 MHz	1100 MHz	3 MB	35 W	Q2 2011	OEM	*DMI 2.0; *Memory: Up to dual channel DDR3-1333 MHz; *PCIe 2.0	Socket G2 / BGA-1023 (in low power and embedded products)
Mainstream	Core i3	2310E	2 (4)	2.1 GHz	—N/a	650 MHz	1050 MHz	3 MB	35 W	2011-02-20	OEM	*DMI 2.0; *Memory: Up to dual channel DDR3-1333 MHz; *PCIe 2.0	Socket G2 / BGA-1023 (in low power and embedded products)
Mainstream	Core i3	2310M	2 (4)	2.1 GHz	—N/a	650 MHz	1100 MHz	3 MB	35 W	2011-02-20	OEM	*DMI 2.0; *Memory: Up to dual channel DDR3-1333 MHz; *PCIe 2.0	Socket G2 / BGA-1023 (in low power and embedded products)
Mainstream	Core i3	2377M	2 (4)	1.5 GHz	—N/a	350 MHz	1000 MHz	3 MB	17 W	Q3 2012	$225	*DMI 2.0; *Memory: Up to dual channel DDR3-1333 MHz; *PCIe 2.0	Socket G2 / BGA-1023 (in low power and embedded products)
Mainstream	Core i3	2375M	2 (4)	1.5 GHz	—N/a	350 MHz	1000 MHz	3 MB	17 W	2012-03	$225	*DMI 2.0; *Memory: Up to dual channel DDR3-1333 MHz; *PCIe 2.0	Socket G2 / BGA-1023 (in low power and embedded products)
Mainstream	Core i3	2367M	2 (4)	1.4 GHz	—N/a	350 MHz	1000 MHz	3 MB	17 W	2011-10-02	$250	*DMI 2.0; *Memory: Up to dual channel DDR3-1333 MHz; *PCIe 2.0	Socket G2 / BGA-1023 (in low power and embedded products)
Mainstream	Core i3	2365M	2 (4)	1.4 GHz	—N/a	350 MHz	1000 MHz	3 MB	17 W	2012-09	$225	*DMI 2.0; *Memory: Up to dual channel DDR3-1333 MHz; *PCIe 2.0	Socket G2 / BGA-1023 (in low power and embedded products)
Mainstream	Core i3	2357M	2 (4)	1.3 GHz	—N/a	350 MHz	950 MHz	3 MB	17 W	2011-06-19	OEM	*DMI 2.0; *Memory: Up to dual channel DDR3-1333 MHz; *PCIe 2.0	Socket G2 / BGA-1023 (in low power and embedded products)
Mainstream	Core i3	2340UE	2 (4)	1.3 GHz	—N/a	350 MHz	800 MHz	3 MB	17 W	2011-06-19	$250	*DMI 2.0; *Memory: Up to dual channel DDR3-1333 MHz; *PCIe 2.0	Socket G2 / BGA-1023 (in low power and embedded products)
Budget	Pentium	B915C	2 (4)	1.5 GHz	—N/a	—N/a		3 MB	15 W	2012-05	$138	*DMI 2.0; *Memory: Up to dual channel DDR3-1333 MHz; *PCIe 2.0	Socket G2 / BGA-1023 (in low power and embedded products)
Budget	Pentium	997	2 (2)	1.6 GHz	—N/a	350 MHz	1000 MHz	2 MB	17 W	2012-09-30	$134	*DMI 2.0; *Memory: Up to dual channel DDR3-1333 MHz; *PCIe 2.0	Socket G2 / BGA-1023 (in low power and embedded products)
Budget	Pentium	987	2 (2)	1.5 GHz	—N/a	350 MHz	1000 MHz	2 MB	17 W	Q3 2012	$134	*DMI 2.0; *Memory: Up to dual channel DDR3-1333 MHz; *PCIe 2.0	Socket G2 / BGA-1023 (in low power and embedded products)
Budget	Pentium	977	2 (2)	1.4 GHz	—N/a	350 MHz	1000 MHz	2 MB	17 W	2012-01	$134	*DMI 2.0; *Memory: Up to dual channel DDR3-1333 MHz; *PCIe 2.0	Socket G2 / BGA-1023 (in low power and embedded products)
Budget	Pentium	967	2 (2)	1.3 GHz	—N/a	350 MHz	1000 MHz	2 MB	17 W	2011-10-02	$134	*DMI 2.0; *Memory: Up to dual channel DDR3-1333 MHz; *PCIe 2.0	Socket G2 / BGA-1023 (in low power and embedded products)
Budget	Pentium	957	2 (2)	1.2 GHz	—N/a	350 MHz	800 MHz	2 MB	17 W	2011-06-19	$134	*DMI 2.0; *Memory: Up to dual channel DDR3-1333 MHz; *PCIe 2.0	Socket G2 / BGA-1023 (in low power and embedded products)
Budget	Pentium	B980	2 (2)	2.4 GHz	—N/a	650 MHz	1150 MHz	2 MB	35 W	2012-09	$125	*DMI 2.0; *Memory: Up to dual channel DDR3-1333 MHz; *PCIe 2.0	Socket G2 / BGA-1023 (in low power and embedded products)
Budget	Pentium	B970	2 (2)	2.3 GHz	—N/a	650 MHz	1150 MHz	2 MB	35 W	2012-01	$125	*DMI 2.0; *Memory: Up to dual channel DDR3-1333 MHz; *PCIe 2.0	Socket G2 / BGA-1023 (in low power and embedded products)
Budget	Pentium	B960	2 (2)	2.2 GHz	—N/a	650 MHz	1100 MHz	2 MB	35 W	2011-10-02	$134	*DMI 2.0; *Memory: Up to dual channel DDR3-1333 MHz; *PCIe 2.0	Socket G2 / BGA-1023 (in low power and embedded products)
Budget	Pentium	B950	2 (2)	2.1 GHz	—N/a	650 MHz	1100 MHz	2 MB	35 W	2011-06-19	$134	*DMI 2.0; *Memory: Up to dual channel DDR3-1333 MHz; *PCIe 2.0	Socket G2 / BGA-1023 (in low power and embedded products)
Budget	Pentium	B940	2 (2)	2.0 GHz	—N/a	650 MHz	1100 MHz	2 MB	35 W	2011-06-19	$134	*DMI 2.0; *Memory: Up to dual channel DDR3-1333 MHz; *PCIe 2.0	Socket G2 / BGA-1023 (in low power and embedded products)
Budget	Celeron	B840	2 (2)	1.9 GHz	—N/a	650 MHz	1000 MHz	2 MB	35 W	2011-09-04	$86	*DMI 2.0; *Memory: Up to dual channel DDR3-1333 MHz; *PCIe 2.0	Socket G2 / BGA-1023 (in low power and embedded products)
Budget	Celeron	B830	2 (2)	1.8 GHz	—N/a	650 MHz	1050 MHz	2 MB	35 W	2012-09-30	$86	*DMI 2.0; *Memory: Up to dual channel DDR3-1333 MHz; *PCIe 2.0	Socket G2 / BGA-1023 (in low power and embedded products)
Budget	Celeron	B820	2 (2)	1.7 GHz	—N/a	650 MHz	1050 MHz	2 MB	35 W	2012-07-29	$86	*DMI 2.0; *Memory: Up to dual channel DDR3-1333 MHz; *PCIe 2.0	Socket G2 / BGA-1023 (in low power and embedded products)
Budget	Celeron	B815	2 (2)	1.6 GHz	—N/a	650 MHz	1050 MHz	2 MB	35 W	2012-01	$86	*DMI 2.0; *Memory: Up to dual channel DDR3-1333 MHz; *PCIe 2.0	Socket G2 / BGA-1023 (in low power and embedded products)
Budget	Celeron	B810E	2 (2)	1.6 GHz	—N/a	650 MHz	1000 MHz	2 MB	35 W	2011-06-19	$86	*DMI 2.0; *Memory: Up to dual channel DDR3-1333 MHz; *PCIe 2.0	Socket G2 / BGA-1023 (in low power and embedded products)
Budget	Celeron	B810	2 (2)	1.6 GHz	—N/a	650 MHz	950 MHz	2 MB	35 W	2011-03-13	$86	*DMI 2.0; *Memory: Up to dual channel DDR3-1333 MHz; *PCIe 2.0	Socket G2 / BGA-1023 (in low power and embedded products)
Budget	Celeron	B800	2 (2)	1.5 GHz	—N/a	650 MHz	1000 MHz	2 MB	35 W	2011-06-19	$80	*DMI 2.0; *Memory: Up to dual channel DDR3-1333 MHz; *PCIe 2.0	Socket G2 / BGA-1023 (in low power and embedded products)
Budget	Celeron	887	2 (2)	1.5 GHz	—N/a	350 MHz	1000 MHz	2 MB	17 W	09-30-2012	$86	*DMI 2.0; *Memory: Up to dual channel DDR3-1333 MHz; *PCIe 2.0	Socket G2 / BGA-1023 (in low power and embedded products)
Budget	Celeron	877	2 (2)	1.4 GHz	—N/a	350 MHz	1000 MHz	2 MB	17 W	2012-07-29	$86	*DMI 2.0; *Memory: Up to dual channel DDR3-1333 MHz; *PCIe 2.0	Socket G2 / BGA-1023 (in low power and embedded products)
Budget	Celeron	867	2 (2)	1.3 GHz	—N/a	350 MHz	1000 MHz	2 MB	17 W	January 2012	$134	*DMI 2.0; *Memory: Up to dual channel DDR3-1333 MHz; *PCIe 2.0	Socket G2 / BGA-1023 (in low power and embedded products)
Budget	Celeron	857	2 (2)	1.2 GHz	—N/a	350 MHz	1000 MHz	2 MB	17 W	2011-07-03	$134	*DMI 2.0; *Memory: Up to dual channel DDR3-1333 MHz; *PCIe 2.0	Socket G2 / BGA-1023 (in low power and embedded products)
Budget	Celeron	847	2 (2)	1.1 GHz	—N/a	350 MHz	800 MHz	2 MB	17 W	2011-06-19	$134	*DMI 2.0; *Memory: Up to dual channel DDR3-1333 MHz; *PCIe 2.0	Socket G2 / BGA-1023 (in low power and embedded products)
Budget	Celeron	847E	2 (2)	1.1 GHz	—N/a	350 MHz	800 MHz	2 MB	17 W	2011-06-19	$134	*DMI 2.0; *Memory: Up to dual channel DDR3-1333 MHz; *PCIe 2.0	Socket G2 / BGA-1023 (in low power and embedded products)
Budget	Celeron	807	1 (2)	1.5 GHz	—N/a	350 MHz	950 MHz	1.5 MB	17 W	2012-07-29	$70	*DMI 2.0; *Memory: Up to dual channel DDR3-1333 MHz; *PCIe 2.0	Socket G2 / BGA-1023 (in low power and embedded products)
Budget	Celeron	725C	1 (2)	1.3 GHz	—N/a	—N/a		1.5 MB	10 W	2012-05	$74	*DMI 2.0; *Memory: Up to dual channel DDR3-1333 MHz; *PCIe 2.0	Socket G2 / BGA-1023 (in low power and embedded products)
Budget	Celeron	827E	1 (1)	1.4 GHz	—N/a	350 MHz	800 MHz	1.5 MB	17 W	2011-07-03	$107	*DMI 2.0; *Memory: Up to dual channel DDR3-1333 MHz; *PCIe 2.0	Socket G2 / BGA-1023 (in low power and embedded products)
Budget	Celeron	797	1 (1)	1.4 GHz	—N/a	350 MHz	950 MHz	1.5 MB	17 W	2012-01	$107	*DMI 2.0; *Memory: Up to dual channel DDR3-1333 MHz; *PCIe 2.0	Socket G2 / BGA-1023 (in low power and embedded products)
Budget	Celeron	787	1 (1)	1.3 GHz	—N/a	350 MHz	950 MHz	1.5 MB	17 W	2011-07-03	$107	*DMI 2.0; *Memory: Up to dual channel DDR3-1333 MHz; *PCIe 2.0	Socket G2 / BGA-1023 (in low power and embedded products)
Budget	Celeron	B730	1 (1)	1.8 GHz	—N/a	650 MHz	1000 MHz	1.5 MB	35 W	2012-07-29	$70	*DMI 2.0; *Memory: Up to dual channel DDR3-1333 MHz; *PCIe 2.0	Socket G2 / BGA-1023 (in low power and embedded products)
Budget	Celeron	B720	1 (1)	1.7 GHz	—N/a	650 MHz	1000 MHz	1.5 MB	35 W	2012-01	$70	*DMI 2.0; *Memory: Up to dual channel DDR3-1333 MHz; *PCIe 2.0	Socket G2 / BGA-1023 (in low power and embedded products)
Budget	Celeron	B710	1 (1)	1.6 GHz	—N/a	650 MHz	1000 MHz	1.5 MB	35 W	2011-06-19	$70	*DMI 2.0; *Memory: Up to dual channel DDR3-1333 MHz; *PCIe 2.0	Socket G2 / BGA-1023 (in low power and embedded products)
Budget	Celeron	807UE	1 (1)	1.0 GHz	—N/a	350 MHz	800 MHz	1 MB	10 W	2011-11	$117	*DMI 2.0; *Memory: Up to dual channel DDR3-1333 MHz; *PCIe 2.0	Socket G2 / BGA-1023 (in low power and embedded products)

Suffixes to denote:

- M – Mobile processors
  - UM – Ultra low power mobile (dual-core)
  - LM – Low power mobile (dual-core)
  - M – Dual-core mobile
  - QM – Quad-core mobile
  - XM – Quad-core extreme mobile (unlocked clock multiplier)
- E – Embedded mobile processors
  - QE – Quad-core
  - LE – Low power
  - UE – Ultra low power

== Cougar Point chipset flaw ==
On 31 January 2011, Intel issued a recall on all 67-series motherboards due to a flaw in the Cougar Point Chipset. A hardware problem exists, in which the chipset's SATA II ports may fail over time, causing failure of connection to SATA devices, though data is not at risk. Intel claims that this problem will affect only 5% of users over 3 years; however, heavier I/O workloads can exacerbate the problem. This hardware bug cannot be fixed by BIOS update.

Intel stopped production of flawed B2 stepping chipsets and began producing B3 stepping chipsets with the silicon fix. Shipping of these new chipsets started on 14 February 2011 and Intel estimated full recovery volume in April 2011. Motherboard manufacturers (such as ASUS and Gigabyte Technology) and computer manufacturers (such as Dell and Hewlett-Packard) stopped selling products that involved the flawed chipset and offered support for affected customers. Options ranged from swapping for B3 motherboards to product refunds.

Sandy Bridge processor sales were temporarily on hold, as one cannot use the CPU without a motherboard. However, processor release dates were not affected. After two weeks, Intel continued shipping some chipsets, but manufacturers had to agree to a set of terms that will prevent customers from encountering the bug.

== Limitations ==
=== Overclocking ===
With Sandy Bridge, Intel has tied the speed of every bus (USB, SATA, PCI, PCIe, CPU cores, Uncore, memory etc.) to a single internal clock generator issuing the basic 100 MHz Base Clock (BClk). With CPUs being multiplier locked, the only way to overclock is to increase the BClk, which can be raised by only 5–7% without other hardware components failing. As a work around, Intel made available K/X-series processors, which feature unlocked multipliers; with a multiplier cap of 57 for Sandy Bridge. For the Sandy Bridge-E platform, there is alternative method known as the BClk ratio overclock.

During IDF (Intel Developer Forum) 2010, Intel demonstrated an unknown Sandy Bridge CPU running stably overclocked at 4.9 GHz on air cooling.

=== Chipset ===
Non-K edition CPUs can overclock up to four bins from its turbo multiplier.

== vPro remote-control ==
Sandy and Ivy Bridge processors with vPro capability have security features that can remotely disable a PC or erase information from hard drives. This can be useful in the case of a lost or stolen PC. The commands can be received through 3G signals, Ethernet, or Internet connections. AES encryption acceleration will be available, which can be useful for video conferencing and VoIP applications.

== Intel Insider ==
Sandy Bridge and Ivy Bridge processors contain a DRM technology that some video streaming web sites rely on to restrict use of their content. Such web sites offer 1080p streaming to users with such CPUs and downgrade the quality for other users.

== Software development kit ==
With the introduction of the Sandy Bridge microarchitecture, Intel also introduced the Intel Data Plane Development Kit (Intel DPDK) to help developers of communications applications take advantage of the platform in packet processing applications, and network processors.

== Roadmap ==
Intel demonstrated the Haswell architecture in September 2011, released in 2013 as the successor to Sandy Bridge and Ivy Bridge.

== Fixes ==
In 2015, Microsoft released a microcode update for selected Sandy Bridge and Ivy Bridge CPUs for Windows 7 and up that addresses stability issues. However, the update negatively impacts Pentium G3258 and Core i3-4010U CPU models.

== See also ==
- List of Intel CPU microarchitectures
- List of Macintosh models grouped by CPU type

Atom (ULV)		Node name	Pentium/Core						
Microarch.	Step	Node name	Microarch.	Step					
		600 nm	P6	Pentium Pro (133 MHz)					
		500 nm	P6	Pentium Pro (150 MHz)					
		350 nm	P6	Pentium Pro (166–200 MHz)					
		350 nm	P6	Klamath					
		250 nm	P6	Deschutes					
		250 nm	P6	Katmai	NetBurst				
		180 nm	P6	Coppermine	Willamette				
		130 nm	P6	Tualatin	Northwood				
		130 nm	Pentium M (P6)	Banias	Northwood		NetBurst(HT)		NetBurst(×2)
		90 nm	Pentium M (P6)	Dothan	Prescott	⇨	Prescott‑2M	⇨	Smithfield
		90 nm	Pentium M (P6)	Dothan	~~Tejas~~	→	⇩	→	~~Cedarmill (Tejas)~~
		65 nm	Pentium M (P6)	Yonah	~~Nehalem (NetBurst)~~		Cedar Mill	⇨	Presler
		65 nm	Core	Merom	4 cores on mainstream desktop, DDR3 introduced				
Bonnell	Bonnell	45 nm	Core	Penryn					
Bonnell	Bonnell	45 nm	Nehalem	Nehalem	HT reintroduced, integrated MC, PCH; L3-cache introduced, 256 KB L2-cache/core				
Bonnell	Saltwell	32 nm	Nehalem	Westmere	Introduced GPU on same package and AES-NI				
Bonnell	Saltwell	32 nm	Sandy Bridge	Sandy Bridge	On-die ring bus, no more non-UEFI motherboards				
Silvermont	Silvermont	22 nm	Sandy Bridge	Ivy Bridge					
Silvermont	Silvermont	22 nm	Haswell	Haswell	Fully integrated voltage regulator				
Silvermont	Airmont	14 nm	Haswell	Broadwell					
Silvermont	Airmont	14 nm	Skylake	Skylake	DDR4 introduced on mainstream desktop				
Goldmont		14 nm	Skylake	Kaby Lake					
Goldmont		14 nm	Skylake	Coffee Lake	6 cores on mainstream desktop				
Goldmont		14 nm	Skylake	Amber Lake	Mobile-only				
Goldmont Plus		14 nm	Skylake	Whiskey Lake	Mobile-only				
Goldmont Plus		14 nm	Skylake	Coffee Lake Refresh	8 cores on mainstream desktop				
Goldmont Plus		14 nm	Skylake	Comet Lake	10 cores on mainstream desktop				
Goldmont Plus		14 nm	Sunny Cove	Cypress Cove (Rocket Lake)	Backported Sunny Cove microarchitecture for 14 nm				
Tremont		10 nm	Skylake	Palm Cove (Cannon Lake)	Mobile-only				
Tremont		10 nm	Sunny Cove	Sunny Cove (Ice Lake)	512 KB L2-cache/core				
Tremont		10 nm	Sunny Cove	Willow Cove (Tiger Lake)	X^{e} graphics engine				
Gracemont		Intel 7 (10 nm ESF)	Golden Cove	Golden Cove (Alder Lake)	Hybrid, DDR5, PCIe 5.0				
Gracemont		Intel 7 (10 nm ESF)	Golden Cove	Raptor Cove (Raptor Lake)					
Crestmont		Intel 4	Redwood Cove	Meteor Lake	Mobile-only; NPU, chiplet architecture				
Crestmont		Intel 3	Redwood Cove	Arrow Lake-U					
Skymont		TSMC N3B	Lion Cove	Lunar Lake	Low power mobile only (9–30 W)				
Skymont		TSMC N3B	Lion Cove	Arrow Lake					
Darkmont		Intel 18A	Cougar Cove	Panther Lake					
Arctic Wolf		Intel 18A and/or TSMC N2P	Coyote Cove	Nova Lake					
