= Tile processor =

Type of computer chip

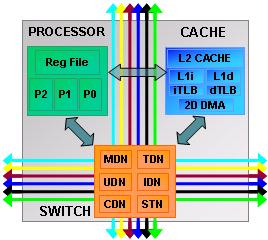
Diagram of Tile64PRO

Tile processors for computer hardware, are multi-core or manycore chips that contain one-dimensional, or more commonly, two-dimensional arrays of identical tiles. Each tile comprises a compute unit (or a processing engine or CPU), caches and a switch. Conceptually, a tile is similar to a traditional CPU core (a compute unit with caches), but with an integrated switch that connects it to the on-chip network.

In a typical Tile Processor configuration, the switches in each of the tiles are connected to each other using one or more mesh networks. The Tilera TILEPro64, for example, contains 64 tiles. Each of the tiles comprises a CPU, L1 and L2 caches, and switches for several mesh networks.

Other processors in a tile configuration include SEAforth24, Kilocore KC256, XMOS xCORE microcontrollers, and some massively parallel processor arrays.
