= Daniel Amey =

American application engineer (1941–2026)

- Born: Daniel Irwin Amey Jr. October 25, 1941; Philadelphia, Pennsylvania, U.S.
- Died: March 12, 2026 (aged 84)
- Education: Pennsylvania State University; Lehigh University
- Occupation: Application engineer
- Spouse: Patricia Lee McNeal (m. 1963)

Daniel Irwin Amey Jr. (October 25, 1941 – March 12, 2026) was an American application engineer.

== Early life and career ==
Amey was born in Philadelphia, Pennsylvania, on October 25, 1941, the son of Daniel Irwin Amey Sr. He attended Pennsylvania State University, earning his BSEE degree and his ME degree in engineering science. He also attended Lehigh University, earning his MBA degree. After earning his degrees, he worked as a research fellow at DuPont.

Amey worked as an engineer for numerous companies, specializing in the field of electronic packaging. In 2008, he was named a fellow of the Institute of Electrical and Electronics Engineers, "for contributions to electronic packaging and high-frequency characterization of ceramic system package materials".

== Personal life and death ==
In 1963, Amey married Patricia Lee McNeal. Their marriage ended with Amey's death in 2026.

Amey died on March 12, 2026, at the age of 84.
