= Performance engineering =

Encompasses the techniques applied during a systems development life cycle

Performance engineering encompasses the techniques applied during a systems development life cycle to ensure the non-functional requirements for performance (such as throughput, latency, or memory usage) will be met. It may be alternatively referred to as systems performance engineering within systems engineering, and software performance engineering or application performance engineering within software engineering.

== See also ==
- Java performance
- Scalability
- Software quality
- Software testing
- Web performance
