= OVN =

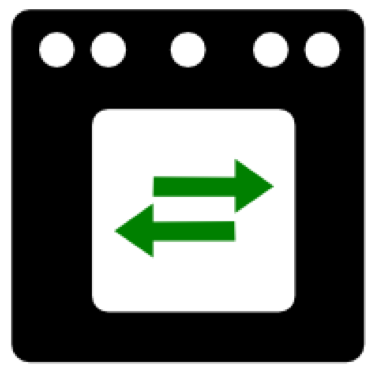
- Release: September 27, 2016; 9 years ago
- Stable release: 26.03.2 / June 16, 2026; 2 months ago
- Written in: C
- Operating system: Linux, Hyper-V, FreeBSD and NetBSD
- Type: Network virtualization
- License: Apache License 2.0
- Website: www.ovn.org
- Repository: github.com/ovn-org/ovn

OVN (Open Virtual Network) is a system to support virtual network abstraction. OVN complements the existing capabilities of Open vSwitch to add native support for virtual network abstractions, such as virtual L2 and L3 overlays and security groups.

== Overview ==
OVN is a network virtualization platform that separates the physical network topology from the logical one. Users are able to connect virtual and physical interfaces with logical switches and routers, regardless of the underlying physical topology. Users are also able to define security policies and load-balancing to these logical instances. OVN uses Open vSwitch for its switching fabric and uses tunnels to provide the logical/physical separation.

Open source bindings for OVN are available for a number of platforms, such as OpenStack and Kubernetes. OVN is the software-defined networking (SDN) platform used in a number of Red Hat products, including Red Hat Virtualization, OpenStack, and OpenShift.

OVN is written in platform-independent C language, which provides easy portability to various environments. The source code is licensed under the Apache License 2.0.

== Features ==
As of May 2018, features provided by OVN include the following:

- Logical switches
- Flexible L2/L3/L4 security policies
- Distributed logical IPv4 and IPv6 routers
- Native support for network address translation (NAT), load-balancing, and DHCP
- L2 and L3 gateways
