= Tilera =

Former semiconductor company

Tilera Corporation
- Industry: Semiconductor industry
- Founded: October 2004; 22 years ago
- Founder: Anant Agarwal, Devesh Garg, and Vijay K. Aggarwal
- Defunct: July 2014
- Fate: Acquired by EZchip Semiconductor
- Headquarters: San Jose, California, USA
- Key people: Devesh Garg, President & CEO
- Products: Central processing units
- Owner: Privately funded
- Website: www.tilera.com

Tilera Corporation was a fabless semiconductor company focusing on manycore embedded processor design. The company shipped multiple processors in the TILE64, TILEPro64, and TILE-Gx lines.

After a series of company acquisitions, Tilera's intellectual property was eventually acquired by Nvidia (via EZChip, then Mellanox), which now ships BlueField products that descend from the Tilera designs.

== History ==
In 1990, Anant Agarwal led a team of researchers at Massachusetts Institute of Technology to develop a scalable multi-processor system built out of large numbers of single chip processors. Alewife machines integrated both shared memory and user-level message passing for inter-node communications.

In 1997, Agarwal proposed a follow-on project using a mesh technology to connect multiple cores. The follow-on project, named RAW, commenced in 1997, and was supported by DARPA/NSF's funding of tens of millions, resulting in the first 16-processor tiles multicore and proving the mesh and compiler technology.

Tilera was founded in October 2004, by Agarwal, Devesh Garg, and Vijay K. Aggarwal. Tilera launched its first product, the 64-core TILE64 processor, in August 2007. Tilera raised more than $100 million in venture funding from Bessemer Venture Partners, Walden International, Columbia Capital and VentureTech Alliance, with strategic investments from Broadcom, Quanta Computer and NTT. The company was headquartered in San Jose, California and operated a research and development facility in Westborough, Massachusetts, USA. It had Sales and Support Centers in Shenzhen China, Yokohama Japan, and Europe.

In July 2014, Tilera was acquired by EZchip Semiconductor, a company that develops high-performance multi-core network processors, for $130 million in cash. EZchip was later acquired by Mellanox Technologies for $811 million. Mellanox developed BlueField, integrating ARM cores with the mesh interconnect of TILE, but was acquired by Nvidia in 2019 for $6.9 billion. Nvidia continues to ship BlueField products as of 2024.

== Products ==
Tilera's primary product family was the Tile CPU. Tile is a multicore design, with the cores communicating via a new mesh architecture, called iMesh, intended to scale to hundreds of cores on a single chip. The goal was to provide a high-performance CPU, with good power efficiency, and with greater flexibility than special-purpose processors such as DSPs. In October 2009, the company announced a new chip family TILE-Gx based on 40 nm technology that features up to 72 cores at 1.2 GHz. Other TILE-Gx family members include 9-, 16-, and 36-core variants.

Their markets for this product announced in October 2011, included:

- Cloud computing applications such as web indexing, search engine and cache acceleration servers
- Networking equipment including intelligent routers, firewalls, network test equipment, and forensic / data-mining applications
- Multimedia applications such as videoconferencing, broadcast video servers, and edge QAM systems
- Wireless infrastructure such as 4G Node B Base Station, RNC, and media gateways

The 36-core general purpose CPU consumes approximately 35 watts at full load.

In October 2010, version 2.6.36 of the mainline Linux kernel added support for the Tilera architecture.

Tilera also provided software development tools called the Multicore Development Environment (MDE) for Tile, and a line of boards built around the Tile processors.

The networking software company 6WIND provided high-performance packet processing software for the TilePro64 platform.

On 25 July 2011, TilePro processor was found by Facebook to be three times more energy-efficient than Intel's x86, based on Facebook's experiments on servers using TilePro processor and Intel's x86.

In November 2012, MikroTik became the first manufacturer to ship devices based on the Tile-GX processors, the product line is called Cloud Core Router.

As of June 2018, the Linux kernel has dropped support for this architecture.

== See also ==
- Calxeda
- x86
- ARM
- Intel Corporation
- Advanced Micro Devices
- Broadcom
- Manycore processor
