= Application performance engineering =

Method of testing in various settings

Application performance engineering is a method to develop and test application performance in various settings, including mobile computing, the cloud, and conventional information technology (IT).

== Methodology ==
According to the American National Institute of Standards and Technology, nearly four out of every five dollars spent on the total cost of ownership of an application is directly attributable to finding and fixing issues post-deployment. A full one-third of this cost could be avoided with better software testing.

Application performance engineering attempts to test software before it is published. While practices vary among organizations, the method attempts to emulate the real-world conditions that software in development will confront, including network deployment and access by mobile devices. Techniques include network virtualization.

== See also ==
- Network virtualization
- Performance engineering
- Service virtualization
- Software performance testing
