= SDxCentral =

Technology news website

- Headquarters: London, United Kingdom
- Owner: InfraXmedia
- Launched: 2012
- Current status: Active

SDxCentral is a United Kingdom–based technology journalism and market data research company based in London, United Kingdom. The company was founded in 2012 as SDNCentral focused on Software Defined Network, and changed its name to SDxCentral in 2015 to reflect its broadened focused on all emerging infrastructure technologies. The site currently receives more than 200,000 unique visitors per month from over 170 countries. The platform was acquired by InfraXmedia, the parent company of DatacenterDynamics, in April 2025, with its headquarters moved from Denver, Colorado, to London.

== History ==
The company, under the name SDNCentral (named for software-defined networking, which was the original intent for the company) was co-founded by Matthew Palmer and Roy Chua in 2012. The idea for SDNCentral came in 2012 after a Twitter feed focusing on technology news run by Palmer and Chua in 2011 grew popular, and the company changed its focus to market analytics and technology journalism, as a way to educate industry drivers on developments in the field. The company changed its name to SDxCentral in 2017, after changing its website in 2015.

InfraXmedia acquired SDxCentral in April 2025, with executive editor Dan Meyer staying with the brand post-purchase. Technology journalist Ben Wodecki runs the day to day operations from the DCD office in London, England.
