= 6WIND =

French networking software company

- Industry: Software
- Founded: September 1, 2000
- Headquarters: Paris, France
- Number of locations: United States, United Kingdom, Singapore
- Key people: Julien Dahan, CEO
- Products: Virtual Service Routers, 6WINDCloud, Virtual Host Accelerator, 6WINDGate

6WIND (/ˈsɪkswɪnd/) is a virtual networking software company delivering disaggregated and cloud-native solutions to CSPs and enterprises globally. The company is privately held and headquartered in the West Paris area, in Montigny-le-Bretonneux. 6WIND has a global presence with offices in the US and APAC. The company provides virtualized networking software which is deployed in bare-metal or in virtual machines on COTS servers in public & private clouds. Their solutions are disaggregated and containerized based on the cloud-native architecture.

== History ==
6WIND was founded in 2000 as a spin-out from Thales Group (previously Thomson-CSF), a provider of electronics for aerospace, defense and security. A 3.75 million euro investment from Sofinnova Partners and others was announced in 2004, and 5 million euros in 2004. Partners include Red Hat, VMware and Wind River Systems. Equipment vendors that provide boards and systems utilizing 6WIND software include Emerson Network Power.

Other partners include: Kalray for data centers, Hewlett-Packard for acceleration technology on ProLiant servers, Dell, Canonical, Alcatel-Lucent for Red Hat Enterprise Linux.

In April 2013, the company announced it would support an open-source software project for the Data Plane Development Kit from Intel. In early 2012, 6WIND introduced a mobile edition and cloud edition of 6WINDGate, for 4G mobile phone companies and cloud computing.

The company announced its Speed Series of packaged software in late 2014, marketed for network function virtualization (NFV). A product called 6WIND Virtual Accelerator allowing hypervisor scaling. A venture capital investment from Cisco Systems was announced in 2014. In 2015, the company announced its Turbo Router Turbo IPsec software.

In 2016 Radware said that their Aleon NG VA product used a product of the company along with OpenStack. That same year Mirantis announced integration with 6WIND for data centers and NFV.

The company promotes its performance by publishing performance tests.

In 2015 Light Reading mentioned that 6WIND software allowed Italian service provider NGI to build a router marketed for software-defined networking.

In August 2017, 6WIND announced a "replacement program" for Brocade vRouter users. 6WIND vRouter is based on DPDK traffic runs in the fast path outside of the Linux kernel, avoiding potential Linux kernel processing bottlenecks. This announcement has been followed by two articles from The Register and SDxCentral comparing 6WIND with dedicated equipment and explaining how the vRouter solution helped a Spanish ISP to become SDN ready.

In November 2022, 6WIND announced a strategic partnership with IP-Tribe in APAC.

== See also ==
- Packet processing
