= EZchip Semiconductor =

Acquired semiconductor company

EZchip Semiconductor Ltd.
- Company type: Public
- Traded as: Nasdaq: EZCH; TASE: EZCH
- Industry: Semiconductors
- Founded: 1999; 27 years ago
- Founder: Eli Fruchter, Alex Tal
- Defunct: 2016
- Fate: Acquired by Mellanox Technologies
- Headquarters: Yokneam Illit, Israel
- Key people: Eli Fruchter (CEO)
- Services: Network processors
- Revenue: ▲US$70.85 million (2013)
- Operating income: ▲US$19.65 million (2013)
- Net income: ▲US$21.70 million (2013)
- Total assets: ▲US$329.70 million (2013)
- Number of employees: 164 (2013)
- Parent: Mellanox Technologies
- Website: www.ezchip.com

EZchip Semiconductor Ltd. was a publicly traded fabless semiconductor company, headquartered in Yokneam, Israel, that developed and marketed Ethernet network processors. It was acquired by Mellanox Technologies in 2016.

== History ==
EZchip was co-founded in 1999 by Eli Fruchter, a Technion graduate in the field of electrical engineering and veteran of the Israel Defense Forces' 8200 intelligence unit, and Alex Tal, who served as EZchip's first CTO and V.P R&D. Until 2008, EZchip operated as a subsidiary of LANOptics, then a developer of Ethernet switching chips and security software. After LANOptics completed its full acquisition of EZchip in January 2008, it changed its name to EZchip and its ticker symbol from LNOP to EZCH. Over the twelve-month period leading up to February 2012, shares of EZchip rose 40% on the Nasdaq index as demand for its processors grew and speculation increased that the company would get bought out.

In July 2014, EZchip acquired Tilera, a company that develops high-performance multi-core processors, intelligent network interface cards and white-box appliances for data-center networking equipment, for $130 million in cash.

In January 2016, a shareholder vote passed that approved the merger of Mellanox Technologies and EZchip. The acquisition was completed on 23 February 2016.

== See also ==
- Silicon Wadi
- TA BlueTech Index
- List of Israeli companies quoted on the Nasdaq
- Economy of Israel
