= Cillium =

Cillium can refer to:

- the Roman North African city Cillium, or Colonia Cillilana, modern Kasserine in Tunisia and the Latin Catholic titular see Cillium
- Cilium, an organelle
- Cilium (computing), a container network interface (CNI) based on eBPF, a project of Cloud Native Computing Foundation

== See also ==
- Caput Cilla, Ancient city and titular see in present Algeria
