= Liz Rice =

British software engineer and open-source technologist

- Born: United Kingdom
- Education: University of Cambridge, École Centrale Paris
- Occupations: Software engineer, author
- Employer: Isovalent (now part of Cisco)
- Known for: eBPF, cloud-native security, container systems
- Notable work: Container Security, Learning eBPF
- Website: lizrice.com

Liz Rice is a British software engineer, author, and open-source technologist known for her work in cloud-native computing, Linux kernel technologies, and eBPF-based networking and security. She is the Chief Open Source Officer at Isovalent, the company behind the open-source project Cilium. She has also served as Chair of the Cloud Native Computing Foundation (CNCF) Technical Oversight Committee.

== Early life and education ==
Rice studied Engineering at Pembroke College, Cambridge and later completed a postgraduate year in Real-Time Information Processing at École Centrale Paris.

== Career ==
After graduation, Rice began her career in systems and networking software, initially working on portable network stack implementations in the C programming language. She later became proficient in Go and was recognised as a Google Developer Expert (GDE) in the language.

At Isovalent, Liz leads open-source initiatives, advocating for the use of eBPF for observability, security, and networking in cloud-native environments. She has played a major role in the promotion and development of Cilium and Tetragon.

From 2019 to 2022, she served as Chair of the CNCF Technical Oversight Committee (TOC), where she helped guide the technical direction of projects such as Kubernetes, Envoy, and Cilium (computing).

Liz is also on the board of OpenUK, an organisation that promotes open source, open data, and open hardware across the United Kingdom.

== Publications and speaking ==
Rice has authored multiple technical books published by O’Reilly Media, including:

- Container Security: Fundamental Technology Concepts that Protect Containerized Applications (2019)
- Learning eBPF: Programming the Linux Kernel for Enhanced Observability, Networking, and Security (2024)

As an international conference speaker, she has delivered keynotes and live-coding demonstrations at KubeCon, and other major industry events. Her Goto talk on containers is widely acclaimed.

== Areas of expertise ==
Rice's professional focus includes:

- eBPF programming for security and observability
- Cloud-native computing
- Container security
- Kubernetes networking
- Open-source governance

== Recognition ==
Rice was named an Individual Winner at the 2020 OpenUK Awards for her contributions to the open-source ecosystem.

== Personal life ==
Rice is based in London, United Kingdom, and maintains a technical blog where she writes about Linux, Go, and kernel security topics.

== See also ==
- Cilium (computing)
- Cloud Native Computing Foundation
- eBPF
