= MsQuic =

Microsoft open source library

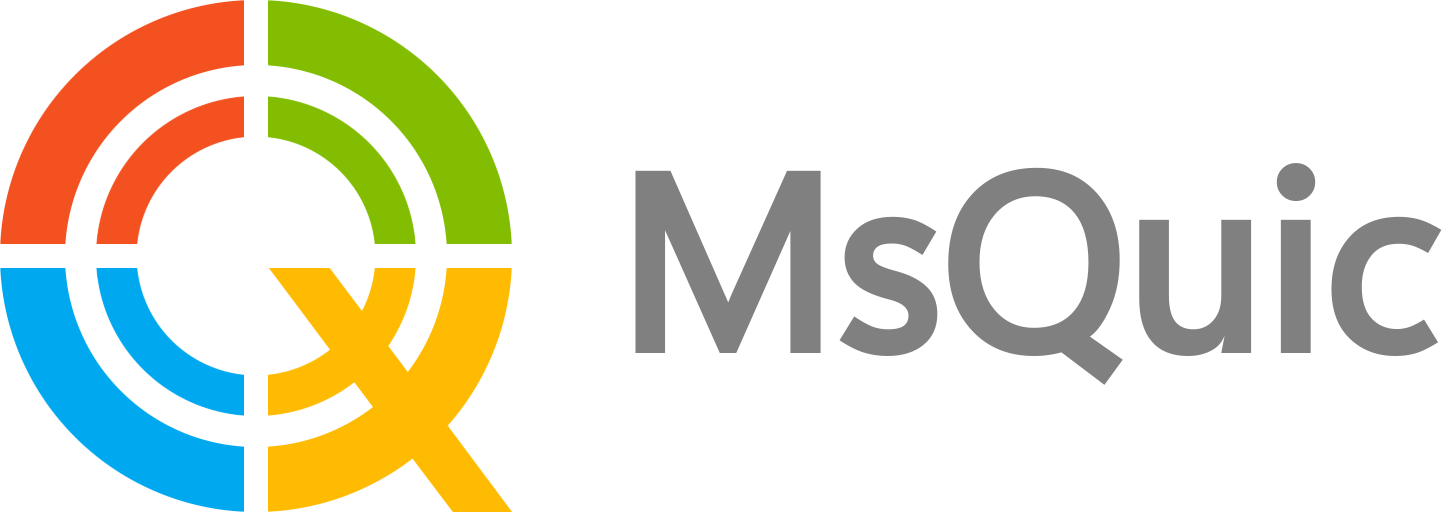
- Developer: Microsoft
- Release: November 27, 2019; 6 years ago
- Stable release: v2.5.4 / August 27, 2025; 11 months ago
- Written in: C, C++
- Operating system: Windows 11 and later, Windows Server, Linux, Xbox Series X/S software
- Platform: Cross-platform
- Type: Software library
- License: MIT License
- Repository: github.com/microsoft/msquic

MsQuic is a free and open source implementation of the IETF QUIC protocol written in C that is officially supported on the Microsoft Windows (including Server), Linux, and Xbox platforms. The project also provides libraries for macOS and Android, which are unsupported. It is designed to be a cross-platform general purpose QUIC library optimized for client and server applications benefitting from maximal throughput and minimal latency. By the end of 2021 the codebase had over 200,000 lines of production code, with 50,000 lines of "core" code, sharable across platforms. The source code is licensed under MIT License and available on GitHub.

Among its features are, in part, support for asynchronous IO, receive-side scaling (RSS), UDP send and receive coalescing, and connection migrations that persist connections between client and server to overcome client IP or port changes, such as when moving throughout mobile networks.

Both the HTTP/3 and SMB stacks of Microsoft Windows leverage MsQuic, with msquic.sys providing kernel-mode functionality. Being dependent upon Schannel for TLS 1.3, kernel mode therefore does not support 0-RTT.

User-mode programs can implement MsQuic, with support 0-RTT, through msquic.dll, which can be built from source code or downloaded as a shared library through binary releases on the repository.

MsQuic also provides the native implementation used by the .NET `System.Net.Quic` API. The library is distributed with .NET on Windows, while Linux users must install the `libmsquic` package separately.

Its support for the Microsoft Game Development Kit makes MsQuic usable on both Xbox and Windows.

== See also ==
- Transmission Control Protocol
- User Datagram Protocol
- HTTP/2
- XDP for Windows
