= OpenUK =

- Formation: February 16, 2018; 8 years ago
- Founder: Stuart J Mackintosh
- Type: Private company limited by guarantee
- Location: United Kingdom
- Region served: United Kingdom
- Key people: Amanda Brock
- Website: openuk.uk

OpenUK is a UK-based not-for-profit company which supports open source collaboration and open technologies within the United Kingdom. Its primary stated focus is to develop and sustain UK leadership in "open technology", consisting of open-source software, open-source hardware and open data. Participants in OpenUK are organisational supporters as well as individual volunteers and committee members, which constitute a body of expertise. In 2020, OpenUK was identified as a key strategic player in UK open source within the European Commission Open Source Software Country Intelligence Report for the United Kingdom, alongside the British Computer Society. The Chief Executive Officer and Chief Policy Officer for OpenUK is Amanda Brock.

== Organisation ==
OpenUK is run by a leadership team covering core organizational functions, with thematic activities across its pillars being driven by workstream committees. Broken down by pillar, these include:

- Community: Events, Museums and Awards committees
- Legal & Policy: Ambassadors, Cloud and 5G
- Learning: Kids Competition and Universities

The organization operates a supporter system, where individuals can sign up to a monthly membership, conferring board election rights and additional benefits. OpenUK also works with partner organizations, on individual activities or generally, through donation and sponsorship models. The not-for-profit company is governed by an elected board of directors, who are held accountable to the company as guarantors. OpenUK is registered in England and Wales as a not-for-profit company, limited by guarantee.

== Activities ==
OpenUK's activity is structured across three themes or pillars; Community, Legal & Policy and Learning.

Within the Community pillar, OpenUK runs a number of events and activities to create a voice inclusive of open technology communities across the UK. In 2020, these included the OpenUK Awards recognising achievement within the UK and contribution to UK leadership in open technologies. OpenUK also undertakes external advocacy, and ran an information stand at the European free software conference, FOSDEM, in 2020.

Under its Legal & Policy umbrella, OpenUK's activities aim to ensure an environment suitable for the use and deployment of open technology in the UK. This includes raising awareness of legal and policy developments within open technology, and collaborating on the EU OSOR report on UK open source activity.

Within the Learning pillar is promotion of open technology understanding and familiarity amongst young people and adults in the UK, including at school level and university level.

The UK government's Central Digital and Data Office identify OpenUK as the organisation to assist with locating resources to support the OpenDocument format.

=== Reports ===
A three-part report titled 'State of Open' was commissioned and delivered in 2021. The Register commented: "OpenUK's latest report paints a rosy picture of open source adoption". The third part, based on a survey of 273 UK businesses, found the UK was the top contributor to open-source software in Europe.

=== OpenUK awards ===
A set of awards is run by OpenUK to recognise contributions to the UK open technology environment, divided across a number of categories:

- Young Person
- Individual
- Open Data: for a company, organisation or project
- Open Hardware: for a company, organisation or project
- Open Source Software: for a company, organisation or project
- Open Source Software in Finance and Fintech: for a company or project

Nominations are made early in the year, from which shortlists of 2-3 nominees are created by the Judging Panel. The first awards ceremony was held online in October 2020. The second ceremony, in November 2021, took place in Glasgow following OpenUK's Open Technology for Sustainability Day at COP26 and included two new categories: Belonging and Sustainability.

==== Winners ====
2020

- Young Person: Josh Lowe
- Individual: Liz Rice
- Open Data: National Library of Wales
- Open Hardware: lowRISC
- Open Source Software: HospitalRun
- Financial Services and Fintech in Open Source: Parity

2021

- Young Person: Samuel Von Stroud
- Individual: Kevin Mayfield
- Open Data: Open Knowledge Foundation
- Open Hardware: DevTank, HILTOP
- Open Source Software: The Herald Proximity Project
- Financial Services and Fintech in Open Source: Wise (company)
- Belonging: Endless Compute
- Sustainability: Icebreaker One

=== Kids Competition ===
In 2020, the Learning pillar included a Kids' Competition, producing online lessons and distributing interactive kits for teams to show creative use of open technology. Kits consisted of a Micro Bit embedded system and MiniMU glove kits split across teams. Materials were produced including animations and explanations of open source concepts by a number of educationalists and technologists, including Imogen Heap. School and community teams organized at a regional level for heats, through a video submission competition for a range of prizes.

The lessons are based on the 10 elements of the Open Source Definition and the contents are available under a Creative Commons license.

=== COP26 ===
Open Technology for Sustainability Day

As part of their Sustainability Strategy and Environmental Policy, OpenUK hosted their Open Technology for Sustainability Day at COP26 in Glasgow. The day included panel discussions and a keynote speech by Lord Francis Maude.

== Board ==
The board of OpenUK are:

- CEO - Amanda Brock
- Chair - Andrew Wafaa
- Dawn Foster
- Emma Thwaites
- Hiren Parekh
- Ian Burgess
- Jim Davies
- Liz Rice
- Lorna Mitchell
- Lou Peers
- Martin Woodward
- Matt Jarvis
- Dr. Rebecca Rumbul
- Rob McQueen
- Steve Bianchi
- Terence Eden
- Tim Telford

== History ==
During a meeting 10th March 2016 hosted by Mozilla, the Chairman of the Open Source Consortium (Stuart Mackintosh) proposed a 'Brand Evolution' to better represent the UK Open Source industry. The two candidate brands presented were the acronym UKOSIA (for UK Open Source Industry Association) and the simpler OpenUK. Feeling that OpenUK was the best option, Stuart had preemptively registered the domain name (March 2015).The name OpenUK was formally approved at the board meeting of 12/05/2016 and the decision to incorporate as a UK not for profit was made.

The OpenUK logo was created by James Bailey and based on the OSC colours, bringing out the orange to provide a sense of optimism, and blue to show strength.

Previously, the OSC, led by Gerry Gavigan had focused on government lobbying and engagements however Stuart was interested in focusing primarily on the industry opportunities as the Government had made strong commitment to Open Standards and open Source. Stuart was strongly motivated by the regular Cabinet Office engagements from 2010 to 2012 under Francis Maude facilitated by OpenForum Europe and industry, realising the opportunity to develop the UK SME Open Source value chain.
