= Appticles =

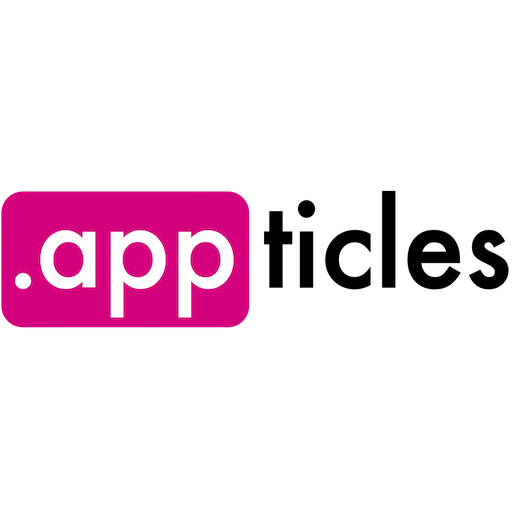
- Company type: Mobile publishing platform
- Industry: Information Technology
- Founded: 2010
- Founder: Alexandra Anghel, Ciprian Borodescu
- Headquarters: London, UK
- Area served: Worldwide
- Website: appticles.com

Appticles is a multi-channel mobile publishing platform that assists content creators to package their existing content into cross-platform web applications. Appticles was developed by London based company, Webcrumbz Ltd, which was founded in 2010 by Alexandra Anghel and Ciprian Borodescu. The company is incorporated in UK with its engineering team located in Bucharest, Romania.

== History ==
Webcrumbz Ltd, the company running Appticles was founded in London, in 2010 by Alexandra Anghel and Ciprian Borodescu. During September - November 2010 the company went through Startupbootcamp located in Copenhagen, Denmark. In 2012, the company won the second round of Appsfuel HTML5 App Challenge and Mobile Web App of the Day Award from TheFWA.com. In February, 2013 Webcrumbz LTD was a finalist at the Mobile Premier Awards held in Barcelona with Journalism.co.uk mobile web application.

== Recognition ==
In 2013, Webcrumbz won Silver for the Best Mobisite at the Mobilio Awards gala, on 16 April with the First Aid Lesson app for MaiMultVerde, Romania. The same year, in October, Appticles was selected as one of the finalists for How To Web Startup Spotlight Pitch Competition. In 2014, the Bulgarian seed fund, Launchub announced it invested in Appticles. In 2016, Appticles was selected for Prosper Women Entrepreneurs Accelerator in Saint Louis, Missouri.

== WPMobilePack ==
Since 2014, Appticles became the main contributor for WPMobilePack, releasing the 2.0 in June 2014. The WordPress Mobile Pack was initially developed in 2009, by James Pearce, who is now running open source at Facebook, with the contribution of Terence Eden, a Mobile Product Manager at O2 (UK), and Andrea Trasatti part of Developer Relations, at the Samsung Strategy and Innovation Center. By December 2016, WordPress Mobile Pack accumulated over one million downloads.
