= Cilium (disambiguation) =

Cilium may refer to:

- Cilium, cell organelles
- Cilium (computing), cloud computing software
- Cilium (entomology), fine hairs on insect wings
