= Registered port =

Network port designated for use with a certain protocol or application

Port ranges
Start	End	Designation
0	1023	System or well-known ports
1024	49151	User or registered ports
49152	65535	Dynamic, private or ephemeral ports

A registered port is a network port designated for use with a certain protocol or application.

Registered port numbers are currently assigned by the Internet Assigned Numbers Authority (IANA) and were assigned by Internet Corporation for Assigned Names and Numbers (ICANN) before March 21, 2001, and were assigned by the Information Sciences Institute (USC/ISI) before 1998.

Ports with numbers 0–1023 are called system or well-known ports; ports with numbers 1024-49151 are called user or registered ports, and ports with numbers 49152-65535 are called dynamic, private or ephemeral ports. Both system and user ports are used by transport protocols (TCP, UDP, DCCP, SCTP) to identify an application or service.

== See also ==
- List of TCP and UDP port numbers
