= Ephemeral port =

Short-lived transport protocol port for IP communications

An ephemeral port is a communications endpoint (port) of a transport layer protocol of the Internet protocol suite that is used for only a short period of time for the duration of a communication session. Such short-lived ports are allocated automatically within a predefined range of port numbers by the IP stack software of a computer operating system. The Transmission Control Protocol (TCP), the User Datagram Protocol (UDP), and the Stream Control Transmission Protocol (SCTP) typically use an ephemeral port for the client-end of a client–server communication. At the server end of the communication session, ephemeral ports may also be used for continuation of communications with a client that initially connected to one of the services listening with a well-known port. For example, the Trivial File Transfer Protocol (TFTP) and Remote Procedure Call (RPC) applications can behave in this manner.

The allocation of an ephemeral port is temporary and only valid for the duration of the communication session. After completion of the session, the port is destroyed and the port number becomes available for reuse, but many implementations simply increment the last used port number until the ephemeral port range is exhausted, when the numbers roll over. Ephemeral ports are also called dynamic ports, because they are used on a per-request basis, and are only known by number once allocated.

== Range ==
Range	Operating system
49152–65535	suggested by RFC 6335 and the Internet Assigned Numbers Authority (IANA) for dynamic or private ports. FreeBSD has used the IANA port range since release 4.6. Windows Vista, Windows 7, and Server 2008 (and subsequent versions including Windows 11) use the IANA range by default.
32768–60999	used by many Linux kernels. (Note: The effective range is accessible via procfs at node /proc/sys/net/ipv4/ip_local_port_range.)
32768–65535	used by Solaris OS and AIX OS.
1024–65535	RFC 6056
1025–60000	default of Windows Server 2008 with Exchange Server 2007 installed. In addition to the default range, all versions of Windows since Windows 2000 have the option of specifying a custom range anywhere within 1025–65535.
1024–5000	FreeBSD versions before 4.6, including the Berkeley Software Distribution (BSD). Default range of Microsoft Windows operating systems through Windows XP.
1025–5000	used by Windows Server 2003 until Microsoft security update MS08-037 from 2008 is installed, after which it uses the IANA range by default.

== Configuration characteristics ==
If certain server software is used, that uses non-ephemeral custom port ranges for initiating some further connections, it needs to be ensured by configuration that this custom port range and the ephemeral port range do not overlap.

== See also ==
- Registered port
- List of TCP and UDP port numbers
