= Brendan Gregg =

Australian computer scientist

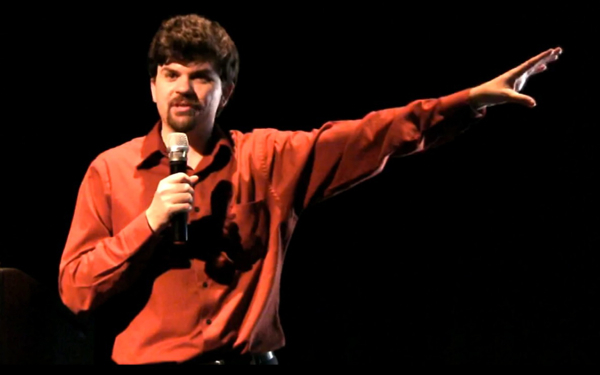
- Gregg speaking at ZFS Day, 2 October 2012, San Francisco
- Born: Newcastle, New South Wales
- Occupation: Computer engineer
- Known for: USE method, eBPF, DTraceToolkit
- Website: www.brendangregg.com

Brendan Gregg is an Australian computer engineer known for his work on computing performance. He has worked at Intel, Netflix, Sun Microsystems, Oracle Corporation, and Joyent. He was born in Newcastle, New South Wales and graduated from the University of Newcastle.

In November 2013, he received the LISA Outstanding Achievement Award from USENIX "for contributions to the field of system administration, particularly groundbreaking work in systems performance analysis methodologies."

== Contributions ==
Gregg developed the USE Method (Utilization, Saturation, and Errors), a methodology for performance analysis of system resources.

He created several visualization types for performance analysis, including latency heat maps and flame graphs. His flame graph visualization was the subject of a paper in Communications of the ACM.

He pioneered eBPF as an observability technology, authoring eBPF tracing tools included in multiple operating systems. As a kernel engineer at Sun Microsystems, he developed the ZFS L2ARC, a caching layer for the ZFS file system. He was previously known as an expert on DTrace and created the DTraceToolkit.

== Publications ==
- Gregg, Brendan (December 2020). Systems Performance (2nd ed.). Addison-Wesley. ISBN 978-0-13-682015-4.
- Gregg, Brendan (December 2019). BPF Performance Tools. Addison-Wesley. ISBN 978-0-13-655482-0.
- Gregg, Brendan (February 2013). "Thinking Methodically About Performance". Communications of the ACM. 56 (2): 45–51. doi:10.1145/2408776.2408791. S2CID 18218617.
- Gregg, Brendan (July 2010). "Visualizing System Latency". Communications of the ACM. 53 (7): 48–54. doi:10.1145/1785414.1785435.
- Gregg, Brendan; Mauro, Jim (2011). DTrace: Dynamic Tracing in Oracle Solaris, Mac OS X and FreeBSD. Prentice Hall. ISBN 978-0-13-209151-0.
- McDougall, Richard; Mauro, Jim; Gregg, Brendan (2006). Solaris Performance and Tools: DTrace and MDB Techniques for Solaris 10 and OpenSolaris. Sun Microsystems Press/Prentice Hall. ISBN 0-13-156819-1.

== Patents ==
- US patent 8881279B2, Brendan D. Gregg, "Systems and methods for zone-based intrusion detection", issued 4 November 2014, assigned to Joyent, Inc.
- US patent 8032708, Brendan D. Gregg, Adam H. Leventhal, Bryan M. Cantrill, "Method and system for caching data in a storage system", issued 4 October 2011, assigned to Oracle America, Inc.
