= Flame graph =

Software performance visualization technique

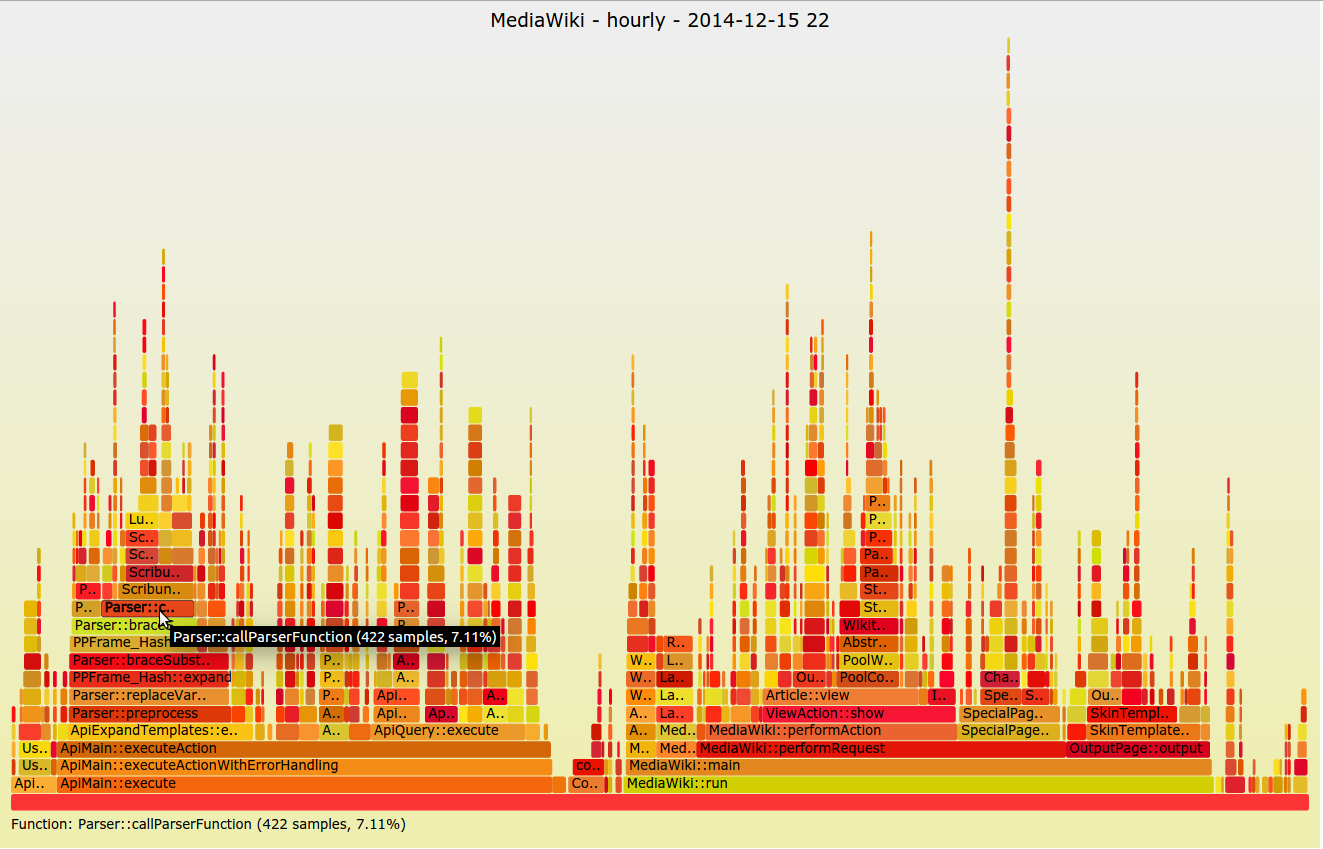
Flame graph from Wikimedia Foundation servers that helped to make Wikipedia editing twice as fast

A flame graph is a software profiling visualization technique that allows for the rapid identification of hot spots in computer programs from stack trace data.

Flame graphs were created by Australian computer engineer Brendan Gregg in 2011.

== Usage ==
The information of a flame graph is represented graphically in a hierarchical manner, creating an intuitive visualization of resource consumption. Each cell in the graph represents a stack frame. Cell position along the y-axis indicates stack depth. Position along the x-axis does not have special meaning; however, cell width indicates "frequency at which that function was present in the stack traces".

The approach is commonly used in profiling system resources such as CPU performance, and memory usage has also seen recent adoption for profiling GPU performance, especially for artificial intelligence software like large language models.

=== Software industry ===
Flame graphs have seen increases in popularity in the software industry, especially in cloud computing, being employed by companies like Cloudflare, Netflix, Snowflake, Amazon Web Services and Google. They are typically used to analyze performance bottlenecks in commonly deployed software runtimes like Node.js and Java, as well as heavy server-side programs like MySQL and MediaWiki.

=== Development tools ===
Flame graphs are officially supported in several integrated development environments, including Visual Studio, Visual Studio Code and IntelliJ IDEA. A flame graph implementation is also included with the web development tools built into Google Chrome and Firefox.

Performance of software across different versions can be represented through differential flame graph implementations, which allow both improvements and regressions in efficiency to be identified.

== Variations ==
A common variant inverts the y-axis so that root stack frames appear at the top of the graph rather than the bottom; this inverted layout is known as an "icicle graph". Other variations include changing the hue of cells to indicate the type of code being executed, and using a color spectrum to convey an additional dimension of data, such as the magnitude of change between two profiles in a differential flame graph.

In the default color scheme generated by Gregg's original FlameGraph toolkit, cell colors carry no semantic meaning on their own and are chosen only to visually distinguish adjacent frames; however, implementations can instead assign colors deterministically by function name, so that the same function is consistently rendered in the same color across different graphs for easier comparison.

Gregg has distinguished flame graphs from the superficially similar "flame chart", a related visualization—used, for example, in the performance panels of Chrome and other browser developer tools—in which the x-axis represents chronological time rather than alphabetical or frequency-based ordering of stack frames, and which some tools have mislabeled as a flame graph.

== Tools ==
The original flame graph generation scripts, written in Perl, are maintained by Gregg as open-source software on GitHub. A D3.js-based implementation, d3-flame-graph, was created by Netflix performance engineer Martin Spier.
