= Jim Roskind =

American software engineer

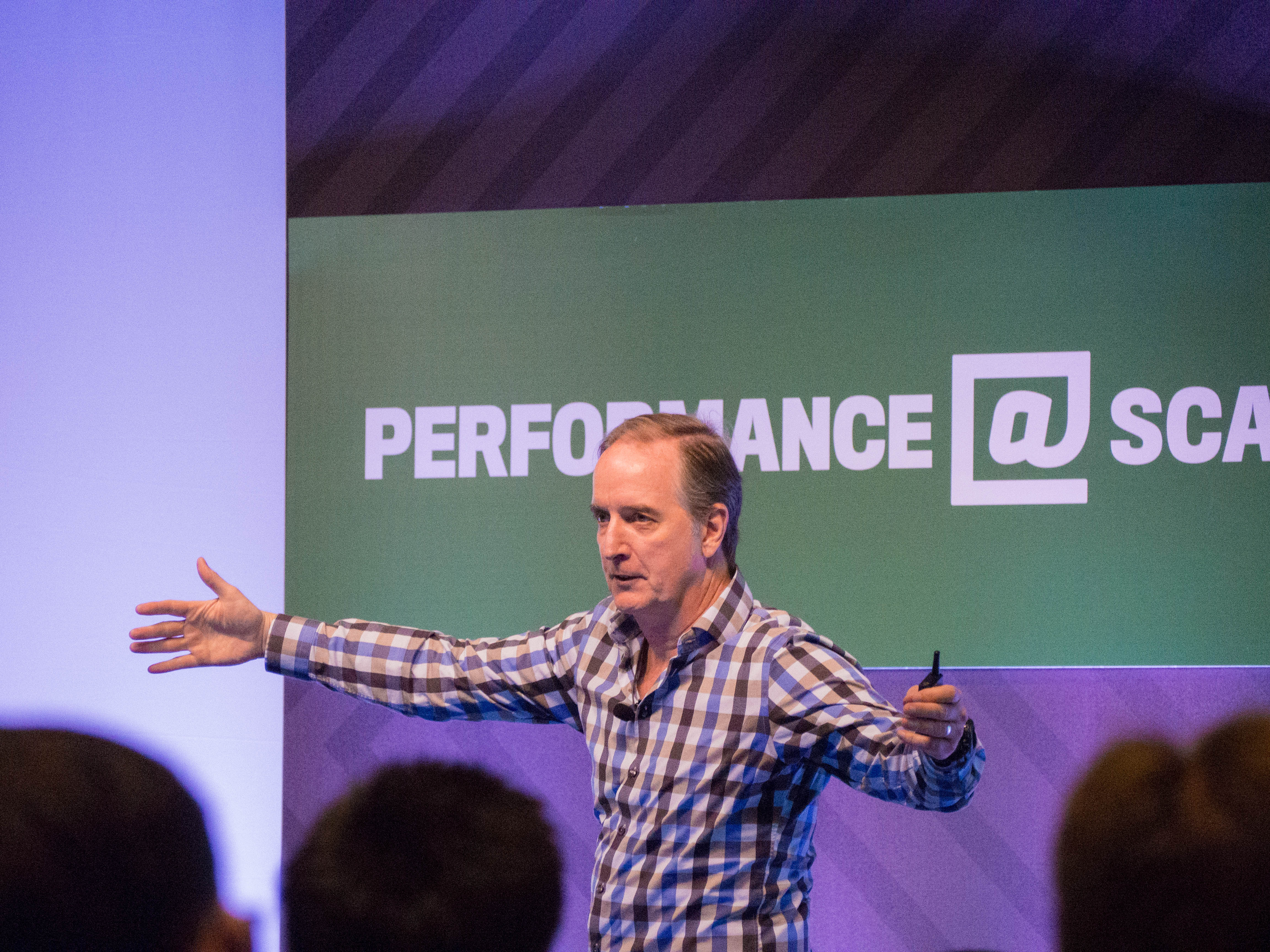
- Born: Bronx NY
- Education: MIT (B.S., M.S., Ph.D.)
- Alma mater: MIT
- Occupation: Software engineer
- Employer: Amazon
- Known for: QUIC protocol
- Awards: Hertz Fellowship (1978); National Cyber Security Hall of Fame (2024)
- Scientific career
- Fields: Computer science
- Institutions: Bell Labs; Infoseek; Netscape; AOL; Google; Amazon
- Thesis: Edge disjoint spanning trees and failure recovery in data communication networks (1983)
- Doctoral advisor: Robert Gallager

Jim Roskind is an American software engineer best known for designing the QUIC protocol in 2012 while an employee at Google. Roskind co-founded Infoseek in 1994 with 7 other people, including Steve Kirsch. Later that year, Roskind wrote the Python profiler which is part of the standard library. From 1995 to 2003 he was chief architect at Netscape during which time he developed Netscape's Java security module.

== Brokerage dispute ==
While at Netscape in 1996, he successfully brought a lawsuit against Morgan Stanley, arguing that the way they sold his stock caused him to get a lower price than he should have. That case was appealed up to the US Supreme Court, which declined to hear the case, leaving in place a precedent where individuals can sue stock brokers for violations of state law.
