= Structured Stream Transport =

Experimental transport protocol

In computer networking, Structured Stream Transport (SST) is an experimental transport protocol that provides an ordered, reliable byte stream abstraction similar to TCP's, but enhances and optimizes stream management to permit applications to use streams in a much more fine-grained fashion than is feasible with TCP streams.
