= Terence Eden =

British technologist and blogger

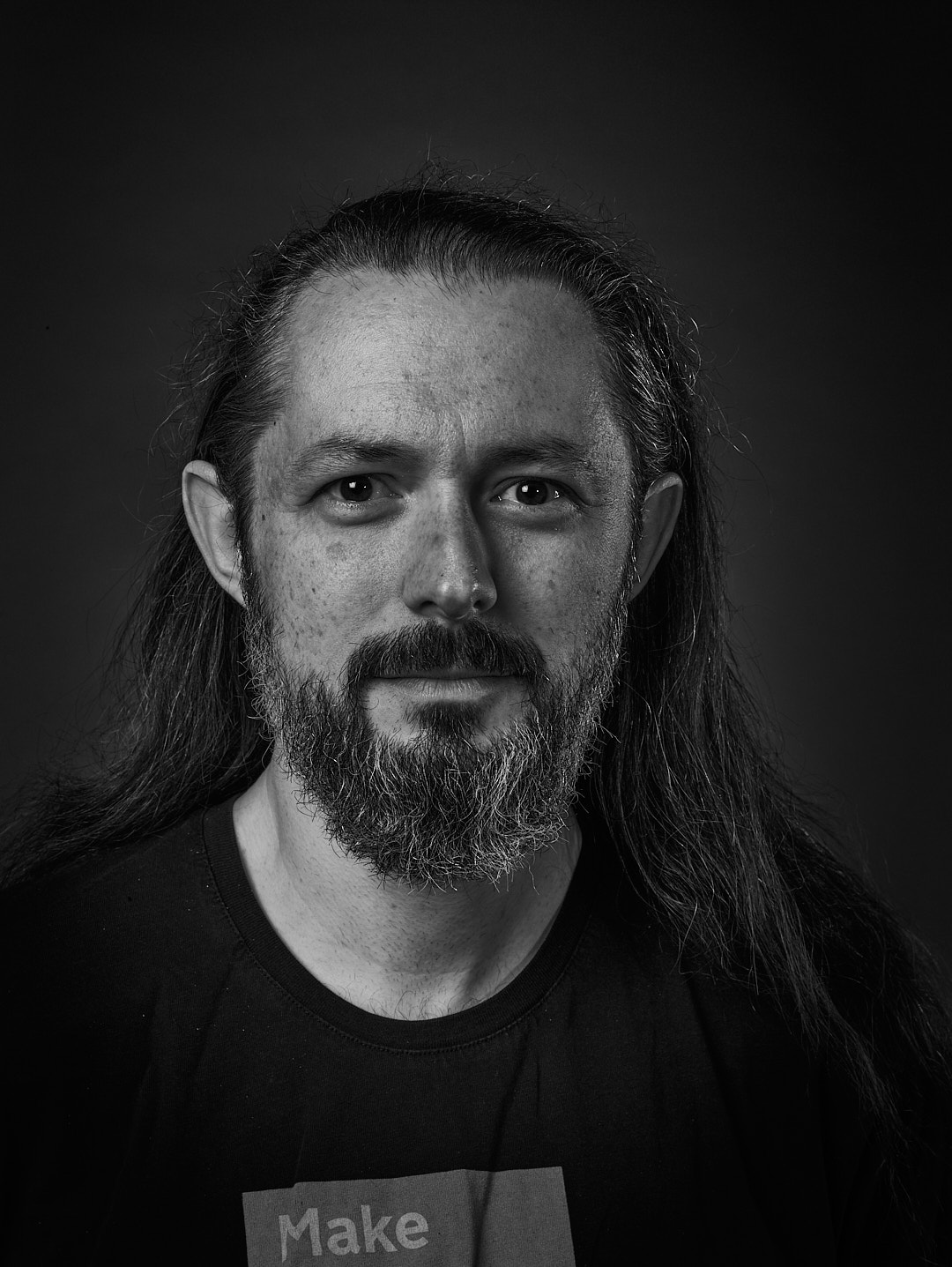
- Eden in 2023
- Occupation: Technologist
- Spouse: Elizabeth Eden (married 2008-present)
- Eden's voice recorded in 2017
- Website: edent.tel

Terence Eden is a technologist specialising in open standards, open data, open source software, and privacy matters.

== Career ==
=== Education ===
Eden graduated in 2002 from the University of East Anglia with a Bachelor of Science in Applied Computing with Chinese. In 2023, Eden was conferred a Masters of Science (Digital and Technology Specialist) in Data and Analytics from the Northumbria University.

=== Public sector ===
Eden was previously employed by the United Kingdom (UK) Civil Service in various roles, including as the Open Standards Lead at the Government Digital Service, Senior Technology Policy Advisor at the Data Standards Authority, and as Lead Cybersecurity Architect of the Central Digital and Data Office

In 2013, Eden proposed for the UK Civil Service to switch from using Microsoft Office file formats to Open Document Format (ODF).

As Head of Open Technology for NHSX, Eden open sourced the NHS COVID-19 contact tracing app on GitHub in May 2020, under the MIT licence.

Eden was formerly a representative to the W3C appointed by the UK Government.

In January 2020, Eden was appointed to the board of OpenUK.

=== Other experience ===
In 2011, in collaboration with Roger Bamkin, Eden developed QRpedia, a mobile Web-based system which uses QR codes to deliver Wikipedia articles to users in their preferred language.

Eden previously worked as a Senior Product Manager at O2.

Eden was appointed as a member of the Google Accelerated Mobile Pages (AMP) Advisory Committee in November 2018. In 2020, Eden resigned his position and explained that he did so because he did not believe that AMP would improve the web: "The stated goal of the AMP AC is to 'make AMP a great web citizen'... I am concerned that... Google has limited interest in that goal". Eden also emphasised the need for "an open, standards based approach to the web".

In 2018, Eden demonstrated a flaw in the Verisart blockchain's verification of artwork authenticity by registering himself as creator of da Vinci's Mona Lisa.

Eden develops and runs OpenBenches together with Elizabeth Eden. OpenBenches is an open data website which catalogues memorial benches around the world through crowd-sourced data. As of December 2023, there were more than 30,000 memorial benches recorded on the site.

In 2024, Eden developed ActivityBot, a simple template for creating self-hosted ActivityPub bots.

== Personal life ==
Eden has been married to Elizabeth Eden since 2008.
