= Reliable User Datagram Protocol =

Internet protocol

In computer networking, the Reliable User Datagram Protocol (RUDP) is a transport layer protocol designed at Bell Labs for the Plan 9 operating system. It aims to provide a solution where UDP is too primitive because guaranteed-order packet delivery is desirable, but TCP adds too much complexity or overhead. In order for RUDP to gain higher quality of service, RUDP implements features that are similar to TCP with less overhead.

== Implementations ==
In order to ensure quality, it extends UDP by adding the following features:

1. The client responds to the packets sent by the server
2. It controls window buffering and congestion to ensure that the server does not exceed the currently available bandwidth
3. In the event of packet loss, the server retransmits the data to the client
4. Over-buffering (faster than real-time streaming)

RUDP is not currently a formal standard, however, it was described in an IETF Internet Draft in 1999. It has not been proposed for standardization.

== Cisco RUDP ==
Cisco, in its Signalling Link Terminals (either standalone or integrated in another gateway), uses RUDP for backhauling of SS7 MTP3 or ISDN signaling.

1. RUDP v0 (no checksums) is used for SS7 MTP3 backhaul.
2. RUDP v1 (with checksum) is used for ISDN PRI backhaul.

The versions are mutually incompatible and differ slightly from the IETF draft. The structure of the Cisco Session Manager used on top of RUDP is also different.

== Microsoft R-UDP ==
Microsoft introduced another protocol which it named R-UDP and used it in its MediaRoom product (now owned by Ericsson) for IPTV service delivery over multicast networks. This is a proprietary protocol and very little is known about its operation. It is not thought to be based on the above-referenced IETF draft.

== See also ==
- Stream Control Transmission Protocol
- Datagram Transport Layer Security
