= Address family identifier =

Unique identifier for addressing schemes

An address family identifier is used to identify individual network address schemes or numbering plans for network communication in contexts where the use of individual addresses might otherwise be ambiguous. Address family identifiers were first defined in RFC 2453. Examples of address families include 32-bit IPv4 addresses, 128-bit IPv6 addresses, X.121 addresses used by the X.25 protocol suite, E.164 telephone numbers, and F.69 Telex addresses. Address family identifiers are used in communications protocols and APIs that support multiple network address schemes, including routing protocols such as BGP and RIPv2.

The list of address family identifiers is maintained by IANA.
