= List of TCP and UDP port numbers =

This is a list of TCP and UDP port numbers used by protocols for operation of network applications. The Transmission Control Protocol (TCP) and the User Datagram Protocol (UDP) only need one port for bidirectional traffic. TCP usually uses port numbers that match the services of the corresponding UDP implementations, if they exist, and vice versa.

The Internet Assigned Numbers Authority (IANA) is responsible for maintaining the official assignments of port numbers for specific uses. However, many unofficial uses of both well-known and registered port numbers occur in practice. Similarly, many of the official assignments refer to protocols that were never or are no longer in common use. This article lists port numbers and their associated protocols that have experienced significant uptake.

== Table legend ==
Legend of TCP and UDP table cells for port numbers
Cell	Description
Yes	Described protocol is assigned this port by IANA, and it is: standardized, specified, or widely used on the port.
Unofficial	Described protocol is not assigned this port by IANA, but it is: standardized, specified, or widely used on the port.
Assigned	Described protocol is assigned this port by IANA, but is not: standardized, specified, or widely used on the port.
No	Described protocol is not assigned this port by IANA or standardized, specified, or widely used on the port.
Reserved	Port is reserved by IANA, generally to prevent collision after its previous assignment was withdrawn. The port number may be available for assignment upon request to IANA.

== Well-known ports ==
The port numbers in the range from 0 to 1023 (0 to 2^{10} − 1) are the well-known ports or system ports. They are used by system processes that provide widely used types of network services. On Unix-like operating systems, a process must execute with superuser privileges to be able to bind a network socket to an IP address using one of the well-known ports.

Well-known ports
Port	TCP	UDP	SCTP	DCCP	Description
0	Reserved				In programming APIs (not in communication between hosts), requests a system-allocated (dynamic) port
1	Yes	Assigned			TCP Port Service Multiplexer (TCPMUX). Historic. Both TCP and UDP have been assigned to TCPMUX by IANA, but by design only TCP is specified.
2	Reserved				De-assigned on 2025-02-13, previously compressnet
3	Reserved				De-assigned on 2025-02-13, previously compressnet
5	Assigned				Remote Job Entry was historically using socket 5 in its old socket form, while MIB PIM has identified it as TCP/5 and IANA has assigned both TCP and UDP 5 to it.
7	Yes				Echo Protocol
9	Yes		Yes	Assigned	Discard Protocol
9	No	Unofficial			Wake-on-LAN
11	Yes				Active Users (systat service)
13	Yes				Daytime Protocol
15	Unofficial	No			Previously netstat service
17	Yes				Quote of the Day (QOTD)
18	Yes				Message Send Protocol
19	Yes				Character Generator Protocol (CHARGEN)
20	Yes	Assigned	Yes		File Transfer Protocol (FTP) data transfer
21	Yes	Assigned	Yes		File Transfer Protocol (FTP) control (command)
22	Yes	Assigned	Yes		Secure Shell (SSH), secure logins, file transfers (scp, sftp) and port forwarding
23	Yes	Assigned			Telnet protocol—unencrypted text communications
24	Yes	Assigned			"any private mail system", often used for LMTP.
25	Yes	Assigned			Simple Mail Transfer Protocol (SMTP), used for email routing between mail servers
27	Assigned				nsw-fe (NSW User System FE)
28	Unofficial				Palo Alto Networks' Panorama High Availability (HA) sync encrypted port.
29	Assigned				msg-icp (MSG ICP)
31	Assigned				msg-auth (MSG Authentication)
33	Assigned				dsp (Display Support Protocol)
37	Yes				Time Protocol
38	Assigned				rap (Route Access Protocol)
39	Assigned				rlp (Resource Location Protocol)
41	Assigned				graphics (Graphics)
42	Assigned	Yes			Host Name Server Protocol
43	Yes	Assigned			WHOIS protocol
44	Assigned				mpm-flags (MPM FLAGS Protocol)
45	Assigned				mpm (Message Processing Module [recv])
46	Assigned				mpm-snd (MPM [default send])
47	Reserved				Removed by IANA on 2017-05-18, previously used for NI FTP.
48	Assigned				auditd (Digital Audit Daemon)
49	Yes				TACACS Login Host protocol. TACACS+, still in draft which is an improved but distinct version of TACACS, only uses TCP 49.
50	Assigned				re-mail-ck (Remote Mail Checking Protocol)
51	Reserved				Historically used for Interface Message Processor logical address management, entry has been removed by IANA on 2013-05-25
52	Assigned				Xerox Network Systems (XNS) Time Protocol. Despite this port being assigned by IANA, the service is meant to work on SPP (ancestor of IPX/SPX), instead of TCP/IP.
53	Yes				Domain Name System (DNS)
54	Assigned				Xerox Network Systems (XNS) Clearinghouse (Name Server). Despite this port being assigned by IANA, the service is meant to work on SPP (ancestor of IPX/SPX), instead of TCP/IP.
55	Assigned				isi-gl (ISI Graphics Language)
56	Assigned				Xerox Network Systems (XNS) Authentication Protocol. Despite this port being assigned by IANA, the service is meant to work on SPP (ancestor of IPX/SPX), instead of TCP/IP.
58	Assigned				Xerox Network Systems (XNS) Mail. Despite this port being assigned by IANA, the service is meant to work on SPP (ancestor of IPX/SPX), instead of TCP/IP.
61	Reserved				Historically assigned to the NIFTP-Based Mail protocol, but was never documented in the related IEN. The port number entry was removed from IANA's registry on 2017-05-18.
62	Assigned				acas (ACA Services)
63	Assigned				whoispp (whois++)
64	Assigned				covia (Communications Integrator (CI))
65	Assigned				tacacs-ds (TACACS-Database Service)
66	Assigned				sql-net (Oracle SQL*NET)
67	Assigned	Yes			Bootstrap Protocol (BOOTP) server; also used by Dynamic Host Configuration Protocol (DHCP)
68	Assigned	Yes			Bootstrap Protocol (BOOTP) client; also used by Dynamic Host Configuration Protocol (DHCP)
69	Assigned	Yes			Trivial File Transfer Protocol (TFTP)
70	Yes	Assigned			Gopher protocol
71–74	Yes				NETRJS protocol
76	Assigned				deos (Distributed External Object Store)
78	Assigned				vettcp (vettcp)
79	Yes	Assigned			Finger protocol
80	Yes		Yes		Hypertext Transfer Protocol (HTTP) uses TCP in versions 1.x and 2. HTTP/3 uses QUIC, a transport protocol on top of UDP.
81	Unofficial				TorPark onion routing
82	Assigned				xfer (XFER Utility)
82		Unofficial			TorPark control
83	Assigned				mit-ml-dev (MIT ML Device)
84	Assigned				ctf (Common Trace Facility)
85	Assigned				mit-ml-dev (MIT ML Device)
86	Assigned				mfcobol (Micro Focus Cobol)
88	Yes				Kerberos authentication system
89	Assigned				su-mit-tg (SU/MIT Telnet Gateway)
90	Assigned				dnsix (DNSIX Security Attribute Token Map)
90	Unofficial				PointCast (dotcom)
91	Assigned				mit-dov (MIT Dover Spooler)
92	Assigned				npp (Network Printing Protocol)
93	Assigned				dcp (Device Control Protocol)
94	Assigned				objcall (Tivoli Object Dispatcher)
95	Yes	Assigned			SUPDUP, terminal-independent remote login
96	Assigned				dixie (DIXIE Protocol Specification)
97	Assigned				swift-rvf (Swift Remote Virtual File Protocol)
98	Assigned				tacnews (TAC News)
99	Assigned				metagram (Metagram Relay)
101	Yes	Assigned			NIC host name
102	Yes	Assigned			ISO Transport Service Access Point (TSAP) Class 0 protocol;
104	Yes				Digital Imaging and Communications in Medicine (DICOM; also port 11112)
105	Yes				CCSO Nameserver
106	Unofficial	No			macOS Server, (macOS) password server
107	Yes				Remote User Telnet Service (RTelnet)
108	Yes				IBM Systems Network Architecture (SNA) gateway access server
109	Yes	Assigned			Post Office Protocol, version 2 (POP2)
110	Yes	Assigned			Post Office Protocol, version 3 (POP3)
111	Yes				Open Network Computing Remote Procedure Call (ONC RPC, sometimes referred to as Sun RPC)
112	Yes				McIDAS Data Transmission Protocol
113	Yes	No			Ident, authentication service/identification protocol, used by IRC servers to identify users
113	Yes	Assigned			Authentication Service (auth), the predecessor to identification protocol. Used to determine a user's identity of a particular TCP connection.
115	Yes	Assigned			Simple File Transfer Protocol
117	Yes				UUCP Mapping Project (path service)
118	Yes				Structured Query Language (SQL) Services
119	Yes	Assigned			Network News Transfer Protocol (NNTP), retrieval of newsgroup messages
123	Assigned	Yes			Network Time Protocol (NTP), used for time synchronization
126	Yes				Formerly Unisys Unitary Login, renamed by Unisys to NXEdit. Used by Unisys Programmer's Workbench for Clearpath MCP, an IDE for Unisys MCP software development
135	Yes				DCE endpoint resolution
135	Yes				Microsoft EPMAP (End Point Mapper), also known as DCE/RPC Locator service, used to remotely manage services including DHCP server, DNS server and WINS. Also used by DCOM
137	Yes				NetBIOS Name Service, used for name registration and resolution
138	Assigned	Yes			NetBIOS Datagram Service
139	Yes	Assigned			NetBIOS Session Service
143	Yes	Assigned			Internet Message Access Protocol (IMAP), management of electronic mail messages on a server
151	Assigned				HEMS
152	Yes				Background File Transfer Program (BFTP)
153	Yes				Simple Gateway Monitoring Protocol (SGMP), a protocol for remote inspection and alteration of gateway management information
156	Yes				Structured Query Language (SQL) Service
158	Yes				Distributed Mail System Protocol (DMSP, sometimes referred to as Pcmail)
161	Assigned	Yes			Simple Network Management Protocol (SNMP)
162	Yes				Simple Network Management Protocol Trap (SNMPTRAP)
165	Assigned				Xerox
169	Assigned				SEND
170	Yes				Network PostScript print server
175	Yes				VMNET service using NJE
177	Yes				X Display Manager Control Protocol (XDMCP), used for remote logins to an X Display Manager server
179	Yes	Assigned	Yes		Border Gateway Protocol (BGP), used to exchange routing and reachability information among autonomous systems (AS) on the Internet
180	Assigned				ris
194	Yes				Internet Relay Chat (IRC)
199	Yes				SNMP Unix Multiplexer (SMUX)
201	Yes				AppleTalk Routing Maintenance
202	Yes				AppleTalk Name Binding
203	reserved				AppleTalk
204	Yes				AppleTalk Echo
205	reserved				AppleTalk
206	Yes				AppleTalk Zone Information
207–208	reserved				AppleTalk
209	Yes	Assigned			Quick Mail Transfer Protocol
210	Yes				ANSI Z39.50
213	Yes				Internetwork Packet Exchange (IPX)
218	Yes				Message posting protocol (MPP)
220	Yes				Internet Message Access Protocol (IMAP), version 3
225–241	Reserved				RFC 1060
249–255	Reserved				RFC 1060
259	Yes				Efficient Short Remote Operations (ESRO)
262	Yes				Arcisdms
264	Yes				Border Gateway Multicast Protocol (BGMP)
280	Yes				http-mgmt
300	Unofficial				ThinLinc Web Access, Spartan protocol
308	Yes				Novastor Online Backup
311	Yes	Assigned			macOS Server Admin (officially AppleShare IP Web administration)
312	Unofficial	No			macOS Xsan administration
318	Yes				PKIX Time Stamp Protocol (TSP)
319		Yes			Precision Time Protocol (PTP) event messages
320		Yes			Precision Time Protocol (PTP) general messages
323	Yes				Resource Public Key Infrastructure
350	Yes				Mapping of Airline Traffic over Internet Protocol (MATIP) type A
351	Yes				MATIP type B
356	Yes				cloanto-net-1 (used by Cloanto Amiga Explorer and VMs)
366	Yes				On-Demand Mail Relay (ODMR)
369	Yes				Rpc2portmap
370	Yes				codaauth2, Coda authentication server
370		Yes			securecast1, outgoing packets to NAI's SecureCast serversAs of 2000
371	Yes				ClearCase albd
376	Yes				Amiga Envoy Network Inquiry Protocol
383	Yes				HP data alarm manager
384	Yes				A Remote Network Server System
387	Yes				AURP (AppleTalk Update-based Routing Protocol)
388	Yes	Assigned			Unidata LDM near real-time data distribution protocol
389	Yes	Assigned			Lightweight Directory Access Protocol (LDAP)
399	Yes				Digital Equipment Corporation DECnet+ (Phase V) over TCP/IP (RFC1859)
401	Yes				Uninterruptible power supply (UPS)
427	Yes				Service Location Protocol (SLP)
433	Yes				NNTP, part of Network News Transfer Protocol
434	Yes				Mobile IP Agent (RFC 5944)
443	Yes		Yes		Hypertext Transfer Protocol Secure (HTTPS) uses TCP in versions 1.x and 2. HTTP/3 uses QUIC, a transport protocol on top of UDP.
444	Yes				Simple Network Paging Protocol (SNPP), RFC 1568
445	Yes				Microsoft-DS (Directory Services) Active Directory, Windows shares
445	Yes	Assigned			Microsoft-DS (Directory Services) SMB file sharing
464	Yes				Kpasswd:Kerberos Change/Set password
465 (Note: TCP port 465 was originally assigned to allow the use of SMTP over SSL (SMTPS), but practical concerns meant that it was left unused and according to the registration rules at that time was subsequently revoked and eventually re-assigned for use by Cisco's URD protocol. Subsequently, port 587 was assigned as the SMTP submission port, but was initially in plaintext, with encryption eventually provided years later by the STARTTLS extension. At the same time, the subsequent adoption of the usage of 465 as an SSL-enabled SMTP submission port, even though the original registration did not envision that usage and despite the fact that it was registered to another service has endured. Subsequently, RFC 8314, in a special exemption to the normal assignment process as defined by RFC 6335, acknowledges the de-facto situation and not only designates message submission over implicit TLS as an 'alternate usage assignment' but establishes this as the preferred method and calls for transition away from port 587 and STARTTLS.)	Yes	No			Message Submission over TLS protocol
465	Yes	No			URL Rendezvous Directory for Cisco SSM
475	Yes				tcpnethaspsrv, Aladdin Knowledge Systems Hasp services
476–490	Unofficial				Centro Software ERP ports
491	Unofficial				GO-Global remote access and application publishing software
497	Yes				Retrospect
500	Assigned	Yes			Internet Security Association and Key Management Protocol (ISAKMP) / Internet Key Exchange (IKE)
502	Yes				Modbus Protocol
504	Yes				Citadel, multiservice protocol for dedicated clients for the Citadel groupware system
510	Yes				FirstClass Protocol (FCP), used by FirstClass client/server groupware system
512	Yes				Rexec, Remote Process Execution
512		Yes			comsat, together with biff
513	Yes				rlogin
513		Yes			Who
514	Unofficial				Remote Shell, used to execute non-interactive commands on a remote system (Remote Shell, rsh, remsh)
514	No	Yes			Syslog, used for system logging
515	Yes	Assigned			Line Printer Daemon (LPD), print service
517		Yes			Talk
518		Yes			NTalk
520	Yes				efs, extended file name server
520		Yes			Routing Information Protocol (RIP)
521		Yes			Routing Information Protocol Next Generation (RIPng)
524	Yes				NetWare Core Protocol (NCP) is used for a variety things such as access to primary NetWare server resources, Time Synchronization, etc.
525		Yes			Timed, Timeserver
530	Yes				Remote procedure call (RPC)
532	Yes	Assigned			netnews
533		Yes			netwall, for emergency broadcasts
540	Yes				Unix-to-Unix Copy Protocol (UUCP)
542	Yes				commerce (Commerce Applications)
543	Yes				klogin, Kerberos login
544	Yes				kshell, Kerberos Remote shell
546	Yes				DHCPv6 client
547	Yes				DHCPv6 server
548	Yes	Assigned			Apple Filing Protocol (AFP) over TCP
550	Yes				new-rwho, new-who
554	Yes				Real Time Streaming Protocol (RTSP)
556	Yes				Remotefs, RFS, rfs_server
560		Yes			rmonitor, Remote Monitor
561		Yes			monitor
563	Yes				NNTP over TLS/SSL (NNTPS)
564	Unofficial				9P (Plan 9)
585	No				Previously assigned for use of Internet Message Access Protocol over TLS/SSL (IMAPS), now deregistered in favour of port 993.
587	Yes	Assigned			Email Message Submission (No longer preferred; see port 465.)
591	Yes				FileMaker 6.0 (and later) Web Sharing (HTTP Alternate, also see port 80)
593	Yes				HTTP RPC Ep Map, Remote procedure call over Hypertext Transfer Protocol, often used by Distributed Component Object Model services and Microsoft Exchange Server
601	Yes				Reliable Syslog Service — used for system logging
604	Yes				TUNNEL profile, a protocol for BEEP peers to form an application layer tunnel
623		Yes			ASF Remote Management and Control Protocol (ASF-RMCP) & IPMI Remote Management Protocol
625	Unofficial	No			Open Directory Proxy (ODProxy)
631	Yes				Internet Printing Protocol (IPP)
631	Unofficial				CUPS administration console (extension to IPP)
635	Yes				RLZ DBase
636	Yes	Assigned			Lightweight Directory Access Protocol over TLS/SSL (LDAPS)
639	Yes				Multicast Source Discovery Protocol, MSDP
641	Yes				SupportSoft Nexus Remote Command (control/listening), a proxy gateway connecting remote control traffic
643	Yes				SANity
646	Yes				Label Distribution Protocol (LDP), a routing protocol used in MPLS networks
647	Yes				DHCP Failover protocol
648	Yes				Registry Registrar Protocol (RRP)
651	Yes				IEEE-MMS
653	Yes				SupportSoft Nexus Remote Command (data), a proxy gateway connecting remote control traffic
654	Yes				Media Management System (MMS) Media Management Protocol (MMP)
655	Yes				Tinc VPN daemon
657	Yes				IBM RMC (Remote monitoring and Control) protocol, used by System p5 AIX Integrated Virtualization Manager (IVM) and Hardware Management Console to connect managed logical partitions (LPAR) to enable dynamic partition reconfiguration
660	Yes	Assigned			macOS Server administration, version 10.4 and earlier
662	Assigned				PFTP
662	Unofficial				NFS v3 Statd port
666	Yes				Doom, the first online first-person shooter
666	Unofficial				airserv-ng, aircrack-ng's server for remote-controlling wireless devices
674	Yes				Application Configuration Access Protocol (ACAP)
684	Yes				CORBA IIOP SSL
688	Yes				REALM-RUSD (ApplianceWare Server Appliance Management Protocol)
690	Yes				Velneo Application Transfer Protocol (VATP)
691	Yes				MS Exchange Routing
694	Yes				Linux-HA high-availability heartbeat
695	Yes	Assigned			IEEE Media Management System over SSL (IEEE-MMS-SSL)
698		Yes			Optimized Link State Routing (OLSR)
700	Yes				Extensible Provisioning Protocol (EPP), a protocol for communication between domain name registries and registrars (RFC 5734)
701	Yes				Link Management Protocol (LMP), a protocol that runs between a pair of nodes and is used to manage traffic engineering (TE) links
702	Yes				IRIS (Internet Registry Information Service) over BEEP (Blocks Extensible Exchange Protocol) (RFC 3983)
706	Yes				Secure Internet Live Conferencing (SILC)
711	Yes				Cisco Tag Distribution Protocol—being replaced by the MPLS Label Distribution Protocol
712	Yes				Topology Broadcast based on Reverse-Path Forwarding routing protocol (TBRPF; RFC 3684)
749	Yes				Kerberos administration
750		Yes			kerberos-iv, Kerberos version IV
751	Unofficial				kerberos_master, Kerberos authentication
752		Unofficial			passwd_server, Kerberos password (kpasswd) server
753	Yes				Reverse Routing Header (RRH)
753		Unofficial			userreg_server, Kerberos userreg server
754	Yes				tell send
754	Unofficial				krb5_prop, Kerberos v5 slave propagation
760	Unofficial				krbupdate [kreg], Kerberos registration
777	Unofficial				machine socket eXtension [msx] protocol
782	Unofficial				Conserver serial-console management server
783	Unofficial				SpamAssassin spamd daemon
800	Yes				mdbs-daemon
802	Yes				MODBUS/TCP Security
808	Unofficial				Microsoft Net.TCP Port Sharing Service
829	Yes	Assigned			Certificate Management Protocol
830	Yes				NETCONF over SSH
831	Yes				NETCONF over BEEP
832	Yes				NETCONF for SOAP over HTTPS
833	Yes				NETCONF for SOAP over BEEP
843	Unofficial				Adobe Flash
847	Yes				DHCP Failover protocol
848	Yes				Group Domain Of Interpretation (GDOI) protocol
853	Yes				DNS over TLS (RFC 7858)
853		Yes			DNS over QUIC or DNS over DTLS
860	Yes				iSCSI (RFC 3720)
861	Yes				OWAMP control (RFC 4656)
862	Yes				TWAMP control (RFC 5357)
873	Yes				rsync file synchronization protocol
888	Unofficial				cddbp, CD DataBase (CDDB) protocol (CDDBP)
888	Unofficial				HCL BigFix Remote Control
892	Unofficial				NFS v3 Mountd port
897	Unofficial				Brocade SMI-S RPC
898	Unofficial				Brocade SMI-S RPC SSL
902	Unofficial				VMware ESXi
903	Unofficial				VMware ESXi
953	Yes	Reserved			BIND remote name daemon control (RNDC)
981	Unofficial				Remote HTTPS management for firewall devices running embedded Check Point VPN-1 software
987		Unofficial			Sony PlayStation Wake On Lan
987	Unofficial				Microsoft Remote Web Workplace, a feature of Windows Small Business Server
988	Unofficial				Lustre (file system) Protocol (data).
989	Yes				FTPS Protocol (data), FTP over TLS/SSL
990	Yes				FTPS Protocol (control), FTP over TLS/SSL
991	Yes				Netnews Administration System (NAS)
992	Yes				Telnet protocol over TLS/SSL
993	Yes	Assigned			Internet Message Access Protocol over TLS/SSL (IMAPS)
994	Reserved				Previously assigned to Internet Relay Chat over TLS/SSL (IRCS), but was not used in common practice.
995	Yes				Post Office Protocol 3 over TLS/SSL (POP3S)
1010	Unofficial				ThinLinc web-based administration interface
1011–1020	Reserved				
1023	Reserved				
1023	Unofficial				z/OS Network File System (NFS) (potentially ports 991–1023)

== Registered ports ==
The range of port numbers from 1024 to 49151 (2^{10} to 2^{15} + 2^{14} − 1) are the registered ports. They are assigned by IANA for specific service upon application by a requesting entity. On most systems, registered ports can be used without superuser privileges.

Registered ports
Port	TCP	UDP	SCTP	DCCP	Description
1024	Reserved				Reserved
1025	Assigned				network blackjack
1027	Reserved				Reserved
1027		Yes			Native IPv6 behind IPv4-to-IPv4 NAT Customer Premises Equipment (6a44)
1029	Unofficial				Microsoft DCOM services
1058	Yes				nim, IBM AIX Network Installation Manager (NIM)
1059	Yes				nimreg, IBM AIX Network Installation Manager (NIM)
1080	Yes				SOCKS proxy
1085	Yes				WebObjects
1098	Yes				rmiactivation, Java remote method invocation (RMI) activation
1099	Yes	Assigned			rmiregistry, Java remote method invocation (RMI) registry
1100		Unofficial			SaltoSystems – Handshake for IP-Components
1112	Unofficial				ESET virus updates
1113	Assigned (Note: Deployment typically occurs only directly over UDP, but other underlying protocol layers which meet the requirements described in the specification are possible.)	Yes			Licklider Transmission Protocol (LTP) delay tolerant networking protocol
1119	Yes				Battle.net chat/game protocol, used by Blizzard's games
1144	Yes				fuscript (Fusion Script) used by Blackmagic Design Fusion and DaVinci Resolve
1167	Yes	Yes	Yes		Cisco IP SLA (Service Assurance Agent)
1194	Yes				OpenVPN
1198	Yes				The cajo project Free dynamic transparent distributed computing in Java
1212	Unofficial				Equalsocial Fediverse protocol
1214	Yes				Kazaa
1220	Yes	Assigned			QuickTime Streaming Server administration
1234	Yes				Infoseek search agent
1234		Unofficial			VLC media player default port for UDP/RTP stream
1241	Unofficial				Nessus Security Scanner
1270	Yes				Microsoft System Center Operations Manager (SCOM) (formerly Microsoft Operations Manager (MOM)) agent
1293	Yes				Internet Protocol Security (IPSec)
1311	Yes				Windows RxMon.exe
1311	Unofficial				Dell OpenManage HTTPS
1314	Unofficial				Festival Speech Synthesis System server
1319	Yes				AMX ICSP (Protocol for communications with AMX control systems devices)
1337	Yes				Men&Mice DNS
1337	Unofficial				Strapi
1337	Unofficial				Razer Chroma SDK Server
1337	Unofficial				Sails.js default port
1341	Yes				Qubes (Manufacturing Execution System)
1344	Yes				Internet Content Adaptation Protocol
1352	Yes				HCL Notes / Domino (RPC) protocol
1360	Yes				Mimer SQL
1414	Yes				IBM MQ (formerly known as WebSphere MQ and before that MQSeries)
1417	Yes				Timbuktu Service 1 Port
1418	Yes				Timbuktu Service 2 Port
1419	Yes				Timbuktu Service 3 Port
1420	Yes				Timbuktu Service 4 Port, Tauri
1431	Yes				Reverse Gossip Transport Protocol (RGTP), used to access a General-purpose Reverse-Ordered Gossip Gathering System (GROGGS) bulletin board, such as that implemented on the Cambridge University's Phoenix system
1433	Yes				Microsoft SQL Server database management system (MSSQL) server
1434	Yes				Microsoft SQL Server database management system (MSSQL) monitor
1476	Yes				WiFi Pineapple Hak5.
1481	Yes				AIRS data interchange.
1492	Unofficial				Sid Meier's CivNet, a multiplayer remake of the original Sid Meier's Civilization game
1494	Unofficial				Citrix Independent Computing Architecture (ICA)
1500	Unofficial				IBM Tivoli Storage Manager server
1501	Unofficial				IBM Tivoli Storage Manager client scheduler
1503	Unofficial				Windows Live Messenger (Whiteboard and Application Sharing)
1512	Yes				Microsoft's Windows Internet Name Service (WINS)
1513	Unofficial				Garena game client
1521	Yes				nCUBE License Manager
1521	Unofficial				Oracle database default listener, in future releases official port 2483 (TCP/IP) and 2484 (TCP/IP with SSL)
1524	Yes				ingreslock, ingres
1527	Yes				Oracle Net Services, formerly known as SQL*Net
1527	Unofficial				Apache Derby Network Server
1533	Yes				IBM Sametime Virtual Places Chat
1534	No	Unofficial			Eclipse Target Communication Framework
1540	Unofficial				1C:Enterprise server agent (ragent)
1541	Unofficial				1C:Enterprise master cluster manager (rmngr)
1542	Unofficial				1C:Enterprise configuration repository server
1545	Unofficial				1C:Enterprise cluster administration server (RAS)
1547	Yes				Laplink
1550	Unofficial				1C:Enterprise debug server
1550	Unofficial				Gadu-Gadu (direct client-to-client)
1560–1590	Unofficial				1C:Enterprise cluster working processes
1581	Yes				MIL STD 2045-47001 VMF
1581	Unofficial				IBM Tivoli Storage Manager web client
1582–1583	Unofficial				IBM Tivoli Storage Manager server web interface
1583	Unofficial				Pervasive PSQL
1589	Yes				Cisco VLAN Query Protocol (VQP)
1604	Unofficial				DarkComet remote administration tool (RAT)
1626	Unofficial				iSketch
1627	Unofficial				iSketch
1628	Yes				LonTalk normal
1629	Yes				LonTalk urgent
1645	No	Unofficial			Early deployment of RADIUS before RFC standardization was done using UDP port number 1645. Enabled for compatibility reasons by default on Cisco and Juniper Networks RADIUS servers. Official port is 1812. TCP port 1645 must not be used for RADIUS.
1646	No	Unofficial			Old radacct port, RADIUS accounting protocol. Enabled for compatibility reasons by default on Cisco and Juniper Networks RADIUS servers. Official port is 1813. TCP port 1646 must not be used for RADIUS.
1666	Unofficial				Perforce
1677	Yes				Novell GroupWise clients in client/server access mode
1688	Unofficial				Microsoft Key Management Service (KMS) for Windows Activation
1701	Yes				Layer 2 Forwarding Protocol (L2F)
1701	Assigned	Yes			Layer 2 Tunneling Protocol (L2TP)
1707	Yes				Windward Studios games (vdmplay)
1707		Unofficial			L2TP/IPsec, for establishing an initial connection
1714–1764	Unofficial				KDE Connect
1716		Unofficial			America's Army, a massively multiplayer online game (MMO)
1719	Yes				H.323 registration and alternate communication
1720	Yes				H.323 call signaling
1723	Yes	Assigned			Point-to-Point Tunneling Protocol (PPTP)
1755	Yes				Microsoft Media Services (MMS, ms-streaming)
1761	Unofficial				Novell ZENworks
1776	Yes				Emergency management information system
1801	Yes				Microsoft Message Queuing
1812	Yes				RADIUS authentication protocol, radius
1813	Yes				RADIUS accounting protocol, radius-acct
1863	Yes				Microsoft Notification Protocol (MSNP), used by the Microsoft Messenger service and a number of instant messaging Messenger clients
1880	Unofficial				Node-RED
1883	Yes				MQTT (formerly MQ Telemetry Transport)
1900	Assigned	Yes			Simple Service Discovery Protocol (SSDP), discovery of UPnP devices
1935	Yes				Macromedia Flash Communications Server MX, the precursor to Adobe Flash Media Server before Macromedia's acquisition by Adobe on December 3, 2005
1935	Unofficial				Real Time Messaging Protocol (RTMP), primarily used in Adobe Flash
1965	Unofficial	No			Gemini, a lightweight, collaboratively designed protocol, striving to fill the gap between Gopher and HTTP
1967		Unofficial			Cisco IOS IP Service Level Agreements (IP SLAs) Control Protocol
1972	Yes				InterSystems Caché, and InterSystems IRIS versions 2020.3 and later
1984	Yes				Big Brother
1984	Unofficial				Arweave mining node
1985	Assigned	Yes			Cisco Hot Standby Router Protocol (HSRP)
1998	Yes				Cisco X.25 over TCP (XOT) service
2000	Yes				Cisco Skinny Client Control Protocol (SCCP)
2001–2009	Unofficial				hexss http server (python package)
2010	Unofficial				Artemis: Spaceship Bridge Simulator
2019	Unofficial				Caddy admin API endpoint
2033	Unofficial				Civilization IV multiplayer
2049	Yes	Yes	Yes		Network File System (NFS)
2056	Unofficial				Civilization IV multiplayer
2080	Yes				Autodesk NLM (FLEXlm)
2082	Unofficial				cPanel default
2083	Yes				Secure RADIUS Service (radsec)
2083	Unofficial				cPanel default TLS
2086	Yes				GNUnet
2086	Unofficial				WebHost Manager default
2087	Unofficial				WebHost Manager default TLS
2095	Yes				cPanel default web mail
2096	Unofficial				cPanel default TLS web mail
2100	Unofficial				Warzone 2100 multiplayer
2101	Unofficial				Networked Transport of RTCM via Internet Protocol (NTRIP)
2102	Yes				Zephyr Notification Service server
2103	Yes				Zephyr Notification Service serv-hm connection
2104	Yes				Zephyr Notification Service hostmanager
2123	Yes				GTP control messages (GTP-C)
2142	Yes				TDMoIP (TDM over IP)
2152	Yes				GTP user data messages (GTP-U)
2159	Yes				GDB remote debug port
2181	Yes				EForward-document transport system
2181	Unofficial				Apache ZooKeeper default client port
2195	Unofficial				Apple Push Notification Service, binary, gateway. Deprecated March 2021.
2196	Unofficial				Apple Push Notification Service, binary, feedback. Deprecated March 2021.
2197	Unofficial				Apple Push Notification Service, HTTP/2, JSON-based API.
2210	Yes				NOAAPORT Broadcast Network
2211	Yes				EMWIN
2221	Unofficial				ESET anti-virus updates
2222	Yes				EtherNet/IP implicit messaging for IO data
2222	Unofficial				DirectAdmin Access
2222–2226	Yes				ESET Remote administrator
2240	Yes				General Dynamics Remote Encryptor Configuration Information Protocol (RECIPe)
2261	Yes				CoMotion master
2262	Yes				CoMotion backup
2302		Unofficial			ArmA multiplayer
2302		Unofficial			Halo: Combat Evolved multiplayer host
2303		Unofficial			ArmA multiplayer (default port for game +1)
2303		Unofficial			Halo: Combat Evolved multiplayer listener
2305		Unofficial			ArmA multiplayer (default port for game +3)
2351	Unofficial				AIM game LAN network port
2368	Unofficial				Ghost (blogging platform)
2369	Unofficial				Default for BMC Control-M/Server Configuration Agent
2370	Unofficial				Default for BMC Control-M/Server, to allow the Control-M/Enterprise Manager to connect to the Control-M/Server
2372	Unofficial				Default for K9 Web Protection/parental controls, content filtering agent
2375	Yes	Reserved			Docker REST API (plain)
2376	Yes	Reserved			Docker REST API (SSL)
2377	Yes	Reserved			Docker Swarm cluster management communications
2379	Yes	Reserved			CoreOS etcd client communication
2379	Unofficial				KGS Go Server
2380	Yes	Reserved			CoreOS etcd server communication
2389	Assigned				OpenView Session Mgr
2399	Yes				FileMaker Data Access Layer (ODBC/JDBC)
2401	Yes				CVS version control system password-based server
2404	Yes				IEC 60870-5-104, used to send electric power telecontrol messages between two systems via directly connected data circuits
2424	Unofficial				OrientDB database listening for binary client connections
2426	Unofficial				VMware VeloCloud Multipath Protocol (VCMP) Dynamic Multipath Optimization (DMPO)
2427	Yes				Media Gateway Control Protocol (MGCP) media gateway
2447	Yes				ovwdb—OpenView Network Node Manager (NNM) daemon
2456	Unofficial				Valheim
2459	Yes				XRPL
2480	Unofficial				OrientDB database listening for HTTP client connections
2483	Yes				Oracle database listening for insecure client connections, replaces port 1521
2484	Yes				Oracle database listening for SSL client connections
2500	Unofficial				NetFS communication
2501		Unofficial			NetFS probe
2535	Yes				Multicast Address Dynamic Client Allocation Protocol (MADCAP). All standard messages are UDP datagrams.
2541	Yes				LonTalk/IP
2546–2548	Yes				EVault data protection services
2593	Unofficial				Ultima Online servers
2598	Unofficial				Citrix Independent Computing Architecture (ICA) with Session Reliability; port 1494 without session reliability
2599	Unofficial				Ultima Online servers
2628	Yes				DICT
2638	Yes				SQL Anywhere database server</ref>
2710	Unofficial				XBT Tracker. UDP tracker extension is considered experimental.
2727	Yes				Media Gateway Control Protocol (MGCP) media gateway controller (call agent)
2759		Unofficial			SuperTuxKart server
2761	Yes				DICOM over Integrated Secure Communication Layer (ISCL)
2762	Yes				DICOM over TLS
2775	Yes				Short Message Peer-to-Peer (SMPP)
2809	Yes				corbaloc:iiop URL, per the CORBA 3.0.3 specification
2811	Yes				gsi ftp, per the GridFTP specification
2827	Unofficial				I2P BOB Bridge
2944	Yes				Megaco text H.248
2945	Yes				Megaco binary (ASN.1) H.248
2947	Yes				gpsd, GPS daemon
2948–2949	Yes				WAP push Multimedia Messaging Service (MMS)
2967	Yes				Symantec System Center agent (SSC-AGENT)
2989	Yes				Zarkov Intelligent Agent Communication
3000	Unofficial				Ruby on Rails development default
3000	Unofficial				Bun
3000	Unofficial				Meteor development default
3000	Unofficial				Resilio Sync, spun from BitTorrent Sync.
3000	Unofficial				Create React App, script to create single-page React applications
3000	Unofficial				Gogs and Gitea (self-hosted Git service)
3000	Unofficial				Grafana
3001	Yes	No			Honeywell Prowatch
3004	Unofficial				iSync
3010	Yes				KWS Connector
3020	Yes				Common Internet File System (CIFS). See also port 445 for Server Message Block (SMB), a dialect of CIFS.
3050	Yes				gds-db (Interbase/Firebird databases)
3052	Yes				APC PowerChute Network
3074	Yes				Xbox LIVE and Games for Windows – Live
3090	Yes	No			Senforce Session Services
3101	Unofficial				BlackBerry Enterprise Server communication protocol
3128	Unofficial	No			Squid caching web proxy
3225	Yes				Fibre Channel over IP (FCIP)
3233	Yes				WhiskerControl research control protocol
3260	Yes				iSCSI
3268	Yes				msft-gc, Microsoft Global Catalog (LDAP service which contains data from Active Directory forests)
3269	Yes				msft-gc-ssl, Microsoft Global Catalog over SSL (similar to port 3268, LDAP over SSL)
3283	Yes				Net Assistant, a predecessor to Apple Remote Desktop
3283	Unofficial				Apple Remote Desktop 2.0 or later
3290		Unofficial			Virtual Air Traffic Simulation (VATSIM) network voice communication
3305	Yes				Odette File Transfer Protocol (OFTP)
3306	Yes	Assigned			MySQL database system
3323	Unofficial				DECE GEODI Server
3332		Unofficial			Thundercloud DataPath Overlay Control
3333	Unofficial				Eggdrop, an IRC bot default port
3333	Unofficial				Network Caller ID server
3333	Unofficial				CruiseControl.rb
3333	Unofficial				OpenOCD (gdbserver)
3344	Unofficial				Repetier-Server
3351	Unofficial				Pervasive PSQL
3386	Yes				GTP' 3GPP GSM/UMTS CDR logging protocol
3389	Yes				Microsoft Terminal Server (RDP) officially registered as Windows Based Terminal (WBT)
3396	Yes				Novell NDPS Printer Agent
3412	Yes				xmlBlaster
3423	Yes				Xware xTrm Communication Protocol
3424	Yes				Xware xTrm Communication Protocol over SSL
3435	Yes				Pacom Security User Port
3455	Yes				Resource Reservation Protocol (RSVP)
3478	Yes				STUN, a protocol for NAT traversal
3478	Yes				TURN, a protocol for NAT traversal (extension to STUN)
3478	Yes				STUN Behavior Discovery. See also port 5349.
3478–3481		Unofficial			Microsoft Teams
3479	Unofficial				PlayStation Network
3480	Unofficial				PlayStation Network
3483		Yes			Slim Devices discovery protocol
3483	Yes				Slim Devices SlimProto protocol
3493	Yes				Network UPS Tools (NUT)
3503	Yes				MPLS LSP-echo Port
3516	Yes				Smartcard Port
3527		Yes			Microsoft Message Queuing
3535	Unofficial				SMTP alternate
3544		Yes			Teredo tunneling
3551	Yes				Apcupsd Information Port
3601	Yes				SAP Message Server Port
3632	Yes	Assigned			Distcc, distributed compiler
3645	Yes				Cyc
3655	Yes				Advanced Systems Concepts, Inc. ActiveBatch Exec Agent</ref>
3659	Yes				Apple SASL, used by macOS Server Password Server
3659		Unofficial			Battlefield 4
3667	Yes				Information Exchange
3671	Yes				KNXnet/IP(EIBnet/IP)
3689	Yes	Assigned			Digital Audio Access Protocol (DAAP), used by Apple's iTunes and AirPlay
3690	Yes				Subversion (SVN) version control system
3702	Yes				Web Services Dynamic Discovery (WS-Discovery), used by various components of Windows Vista and later
3721	Unofficial				ES File Explorer FTP server
3724	Yes				Some Blizzard games
3724	Unofficial				Club Penguin Disney online game for kids
3725	Yes				Netia NA-ER Port
3749	Yes				CimTrak registered port
3768	Yes				RBLcheckd server daemon
3784		Yes			Bidirectional Forwarding Detection (BFD)for IPv4 and IPv6 (Single Hop) (RFC 5881)
3785		Unofficial			VoIP program used by Ventrilo
3799		Yes			RADIUS change of authorization
3804	Yes				Harman Professional HiQnet protocol
3825	Unofficial				RedSeal Networks client/server connection
3826	Yes				WarMUX game server
3826	Unofficial				RedSeal Networks client/server connection
3835	Unofficial				RedSeal Networks client/server connection
3830	Yes				System Management Agent, developed and used by Cerner to monitor and manage solutions
3856	Unofficial				ERP Server Application used by F10 Software
3880	Yes				IGRS
3868	Yes		Yes		Diameter base protocol (RFC 3588)
3872	Yes				Oracle Enterprise Manager Remote Agent
3900	Yes				udt_os, IBM UniData UDT OS
3911	Yes	Yes			prnstatus, Printer Status Port
3960		Unofficial			Warframe online interaction
3962		Unofficial			Warframe online interaction
3978	Unofficial				OpenTTD game (masterserver and content service)
3978	Unofficial				Palo Alto Networks' Panorama management of firewalls and log collectors & pre-PAN-OS 8.0 Panorama-to-managed devices software updates.
3979	Unofficial				OpenTTD game
3999	Yes				Norman distributed scanning service
4000	Unofficial				Diablo II game
4001	Unofficial				Microsoft Ants game
4001	Unofficial				CoreOS etcd client communication
4001	Unofficial				InterPlanetary File System swarm node
4018	Yes				Protocol information and warnings
4035	Unofficial				IBM Rational Developer for System z Remote System Explorer Daemon
4045	Unofficial				Solaris lockd NFS lock daemon/manager
4050	Unofficial				Mud Master Chat protocol (MMCP) – Peer-to-peer communications between MUD clients.
4061	Yes				Ice RPC Locator
4063	Assigned				Ice RPC Firewall Traversal Service over TCP
4063	Unofficial				Open Microscopy Environment Remote Objects (OMERO)
4064	Assigned				Ice RPC Firewall Traversal Service over SSL
4064	Unofficial				Open Microscopy Environment Remote Objects (OMERO)
4069		Yes			Minger Email Address Verification Protocol
4070	Unofficial				Amazon Echo Dot (Amazon Alexa) streaming connection with Spotify
4089	Yes				OpenCORE Remote Control Service
4090	Yes				Kerio
4093	Yes				PxPlus Client server interface ProvideX
4096	Yes				Ascom Timeplex Bridge Relay Element (BRE)
4105	Yes				Shofar (ShofarNexus)
4111	Yes	Assigned			Xgrid
4116	Yes				Smartcard-TLS
4123	Assigned	Yes			Z-Wave Protocol
4125	Unofficial				Microsoft Remote Web Workplace administration
4172	Yes				Teradici PCoIP
4190	Yes				ManageSieve
4195	Yes				AWS protocol for cloud remoting solution
4197	Yes				Harman International's HControl protocol for control and monitoring of Audio, Video, Lighting and Control equipment
4198	Unofficial				Couch Potato Android app
4200	Unofficial				Angular app
4201	Unofficial				TinyMUD and various derivatives
4213	Unofficial				DuckDB UI default port
4222	Unofficial				NATS server default port
4226	Unofficial				Aleph One, a computer game
4242	Unofficial				Orthanc – DICOM server
4242	Unofficial				Quassel distributed IRC client
4243	Unofficial				Docker implementations, redistributions, and setups default
4243	Unofficial				CrashPlan
4244	Unofficial				Viber
4303	Yes				Simple Railroad Command Protocol (SRCP)
4307	Yes				TrueConf Client – TrueConf Server media data exchange
4321	Yes				Referral Whois (RWhois) Protocol
4420	Yes				NVM Express over Fabrics storage access
4433		Unofficial			SaltoSystems – DTLS Based Communication for NCoder
4444	Unofficial				Oracle WebCenter Content: Content Server—Intradoc Socket port. (formerly known as Oracle Universal Content Management).
4444	Unofficial				Metasploit's default listener port
4444	Unofficial				Xvfb X server virtual frame buffer service
4444	Unofficial				OpenOCD (Telnet)
4444–4445	Unofficial				I2P HTTP/S proxy
4455	Unofficial				OBS Studio built-in WebSocket plugin default port
4460	Yes	Assigned			Network Time Security Key Establishment (NTS)
4486	Yes				Integrated Client Message Service (ICMS)
4488	Yes	Assigned			Apple Wide Area Connectivity Service, used by Back to My Mac
4500	Assigned	Yes			IPSec NAT Traversal (RFC 3947, RFC 4306)
4502–4534	Yes				Microsoft Silverlight connectable ports under non-elevated trust
4505–4506	Unofficial				Salt master
4534		Unofficial			Armagetron Advanced server default
4560	Unofficial				default Log4j socketappender port
4567	Unofficial				Sinatra default server port in development mode (HTTP)
4569		Yes			Inter-Asterisk eXchange (IAX2)
4604	Yes				Identity Registration Protocol
4605	Yes				Direct End to End Secure Chat Protocol
4610–4640	Unofficial				QualiSystems TestShell Suite Services
4662	Yes				OrbitNet Message Service
4662	Unofficial				Default for older versions of eMule
4664	Unofficial				Google Desktop Search
4672		Unofficial			Default for older versions of eMule
4711	Unofficial				eMule optional web interface
4713	Unofficial				PulseAudio sound server
4723	Unofficial				Appium open source automation tool
4724	Unofficial				Default bootstrap port to use on device to talk to Appium
4728	Yes				Computer Associates Desktop and Server Management (DMP)/Port Multiplexer
4730	Yes				Gearman's job server
4739	Yes				IP Flow Information Export
4747	Unofficial				Apprentice
4753	Yes				SIMON (service and discovery)
4789		Yes			Virtual eXtensible Local Area Network (VXLAN)
4791		Yes			IP Routable RocE (RoCEv2)
4840	Yes				OPC UA Connection Protocol (TCP) and OPC UA Multicast Datagram Protocol (UDP) for OPC Unified Architecture from OPC Foundation
4843	Yes				OPC UA TCP Protocol over TLS/SSL for OPC Unified Architecture from OPC Foundation
4847	Yes				Web Fresh Communication, Quadrion Software & Odorless Entertainment
4848	Unofficial				Java GlassFish Application Server administration default
4894	Yes				LysKOM Protocol A
4900	Unofficial				HFSQL (Hyperfile SQL) Mantra Server from PC SOFT
4944	No	Unofficial			DrayTek DSL Status Monitoring
4949	Yes				Munin Resource Monitoring Tool
4950	Yes				Cylon Controls UC32 Communications Port
5000	Unofficial				UPnP—Windows network device interoperability
5000	Unofficial				VTun, VPN Software
5000	Unofficial				ASP.NET Core — Development Webserver
5000		Unofficial			FlightGear multiplayer
5000	Unofficial				Synology Inc. Management Console, File Station, Audio Station
5000	Unofficial				Flask Development Webserver
5000	Unofficial				Heroku console access
5000	Unofficial				Docker Registry
5000	Unofficial				AT&T U-verse public, educational, and government access (PEG) streaming over HTTP
5000	Unofficial				High-Speed SECS Message Services
5000	Unofficial				3CX Phone System Management Console/Web Client (HTTP)
5000	Unofficial				RidgeRun GStreamer Daemon (GSTD)
5000	Unofficial				Apple's AirPlay Receiver
5000	Unofficial				AWS Elastic Beanstalk Proxy server
5000	Unofficial				Frigate NVR unauthenticated UI & API
5000–5500	No	Unofficial			League of Legends, a multiplayer online battle arena video game
5001	Unofficial				Slingbox and Slingplayer
5001	Unofficial				Iperf (Tool for measuring TCP and UDP bandwidth performance)
5001	Unofficial				Synology Inc. Secured Management Console, File Station, Audio Station
5001	Unofficial				3CX Phone System Management Console/Web Client (HTTPS)
5001	Unofficial				InterPlanetary File System RPC API
5002	Unofficial				ASSA ARX access control system
5003	Yes	Assigned			FileMaker – name binding and transport
5004	Yes			Yes	Real-time Transport Protocol media data (RTP) (RFC 3551, RFC 4571)
5005	Yes			Yes	Real-time Transport Protocol control protocol (RTCP) (RFC 3551, RFC 4571)
5007	Unofficial				Palo Alto Networks – User-ID agent
5010	Yes				Registered to: TelePath (the IBM FlowMark workflow-management system messaging platform); The TCP port is now used for: IBM WebSphere MQ Workflow
5011	Yes				TelePath (the IBM FlowMark workflow-management system messaging platform)
5022	Unofficial				MSSQL Server Replication and Database mirroring endpoints
5025	Yes				scpi-raw Standard Commands for Programmable Instruments
5029		Unofficial			Sonic Robo Blast 2 and Sonic Robo Blast 2 Kart servers
5031	Unofficial				AVM CAPI-over-TCP (ISDN over Ethernet tunneling)
5037	Unofficial				Android ADB server
5044	Yes				Standard port in Filebeats/Logstash implementation of Lumberjack protocol.
5048	Yes				Texai Message Service
5050	Unofficial				Yahoo! Messenger
5051	Yes				ita-agent Symantec Intruder Alert
5060	Yes				Session Initiation Protocol (SIP)
5061	Yes				Session Initiation Protocol (SIP) over TLS
5062	Yes				Localisation access
5064	Yes				EPICS Channel Access server
5065	Assigned	Yes			EPICS Channel Access repeater beacon
5070	Unofficial	No			Binary Floor Control Protocol (BFCP)
5075	Yes	No			EPICS PV Access Data
5076	No	Yes			EPICS PV Access Searches
5080	Unofficial				NEC Phone System SV8100 and SV9100 MLC phones: default iSIP port
5084	Yes				EPCglobal Low Level Reader Protocol (LLRP)
5085	Yes				EPCglobal Low Level Reader Protocol (LLRP) over TLS
5090	Unofficial				3CX Phone System 3CX Tunnel Protocol, 3CX App API, 3CX Session Border Controller
5093		Yes			Thales Sentinel (was SafeNet, Gemalto), Sentinel LM / Sentinel RMS, client-to-server
5099	Yes				Thales Sentinel (was SafeNet, Gemalto), Sentinel LM / Sentinel RMS, server-to-server
5104	Unofficial				IBM Tivoli Framework NetCOOL/Impact HTTP Service
5121	Unofficial				Neverwinter Nights
5150	Yes				ATMP Ascend Tunnel Management Protocol
5151	Yes				ESRI SDE Instance
5151		Yes			ESRI SDE Remote Start
5154	Yes				BZFlag
5172	Yes				PC over IP Endpoint Management
5173	Unofficial				Vite
5190	Yes				AOL Instant Messenger protocol. The chat app is defunct as of 15 December 2017.
5198		Unofficial			EchoLink VoIP Amateur Radio Software (Voice)
5199		Unofficial			EchoLink VoIP Amateur Radio Software (Voice)
5200	Unofficial				EchoLink VoIP Amateur Radio Software (Information)
5201	Unofficial				Iperf3 (Tool for measuring TCP and UDP bandwidth performance)
5222	Yes	Reserved			Extensible Messaging and Presence Protocol (XMPP) client connection
5223	Unofficial				Apple Push Notification Service
5223	Unofficial				Extensible Messaging and Presence Protocol (XMPP) client connection over SSL
5228	Yes				HP Virtual Room Service
5228	Unofficial				Google Play, Android Cloud to Device Messaging Service, Google Cloud Messaging
5231	Yes				Remote Control of Scan Software for Cruse Scanners
5232	Yes				Cruse Scanning System Service
5232	Unofficial				Silicon Graphics Distributed Graphics Library daemon (dgld)
5235–5236	Unofficial				Firebase Cloud Messaging
5242	Unofficial				Viber
5243	Unofficial				Viber
5246		Yes			Control And Provisioning of Wireless Access Points (CAPWAP) CAPWAP control
5247		Yes			Control And Provisioning of Wireless Access Points (CAPWAP) CAPWAP data
5269	Yes				Extensible Messaging and Presence Protocol (XMPP) server-to-server connection
5280	Yes				Extensible Messaging and Presence Protocol (XMPP)
5281	Unofficial				Extensible Messaging and Presence Protocol (XMPP)
5298	Yes				Extensible Messaging and Presence Protocol (XMPP)
5310	Assigned	Yes			Outlaws, a 1997 first-person shooter video game
5318	Yes	Reserved			Certificate Management over CMS
5349	Yes				STUN over TLS/DTLS, a protocol for NAT traversal
5349	Yes				TURN over TLS/DTLS, a protocol for NAT traversal
5349	Yes	Reserved			STUN Behavior Discovery over TLS. See also port 3478.
5351	Reserved	Yes			NAT Port Mapping Protocol and Port Control Protocol—client-requested configuration for connections through network address translators and firewalls
5353	Assigned	Yes			Multicast DNS (mDNS)
5355	Yes				Link-Local Multicast Name Resolution (LLMNR), allows hosts to perform name resolution for hosts on the same local link (only provided by Windows Vista and Server 2008)
5357	Unofficial				Web Services for Devices (WSDAPI) (starting from Windows Vista, Windows 7 and Server 2008)
5358	Unofficial				WSDAPI Applications to Use a Secure Channel (only provided by Windows Vista, Windows 7 and Server 2008)
5394		Unofficial			Kega Fusion, a Sega multi-console emulator
5402	Yes				Multicast File Transfer Protocol (MFTP)
5405	Yes				NetSupport Manager
5412	Yes				IBM Rational Synergy (Telelogic Synergy) (Continuus CM) Message Router
5413	Yes				Wonderware SuiteLink service
5417	Yes				SNS Agent
5421	Yes				NetSupport Manager
5432	Yes	Assigned			PostgreSQL database system
5433	Unofficial				Bouwsoft file/webserver
5445		Unofficial			Cisco Unified Video Advantage
5450	Unofficial				OSIsoft PI Server Client Access
5457	Unofficial				OSIsoft PI Asset Framework Client Access
5458	Unofficial				OSIsoft PI Notifications Client Access
5480	Unofficial				VMware VAMI (Virtual Appliance Management Infrastructure) — used for initial setup of various administration settings on Virtual Appliances designed using the VAMI architecture.
5481	Unofficial				Schneider Electric's ClearSCADA (SCADA implementation for Windows) — used for client-to-server communication.
5495	Unofficial				IBM Cognos TM1 Admin server
5498	Unofficial				Hotline tracker server connection
5499		Unofficial			Hotline tracker server discovery
5500	Unofficial				Hotline control connection
5500	Unofficial				VNC Remote Framebuffer (RFB) protocol — for incoming listening viewer
5501	Unofficial				Hotline file transfer connection
5517	Unofficial				Setiqueue Proxy server client for SETI@Home project
5520		Unofficial			Hytale multiplayer server
5540	Yes	Yes			Matter Operational Discovery and Communi[cation]
5550	Unofficial				Hewlett-Packard Data Protector
5554	Unofficial				Fastboot default wireless port
5555	Unofficial				Oracle WebCenter Content: Inbound Refinery—Intradoc Socket port. (formerly known as Oracle Universal Content Management). Port though often changed during installation
5555	Unofficial				Freeciv versions up to 2.0, Hewlett-Packard Data Protector, McAfee EndPoint Encryption Database Server, SAP, Default for Microsoft Dynamics CRM 4.0, Softether VPN default port
5555	Unofficial				Wireless adb (Android Debug Bridge) control of an Android device over the network.
5556	Yes				Freeciv, Oracle WebLogic Server Node Manager
5568	Yes				Session Data Transport (SDT), a part of Architecture for Control Networks (ACN)
5601	Unofficial				Kibana
5631	Yes				pcANYWHEREdata, Symantec pcAnywhere (version 7.52 and later) data
5632		Yes			pcANYWHEREstat, Symantec pcAnywhere (version 7.52 and later) status
5656	Unofficial				IBM Lotus Sametime p2p file transfer
5657	Unofficial				PufferPanel SFTP / SCP
5666	Unofficial				NRPE (Nagios)
5667	Unofficial				NSCA (Nagios)
5670	Yes				FILEMQ ZeroMQ File Message Queuing Protocol
5670		Yes			ZRE-DISC ZeroMQ Realtime Exchange Protocol (Discovery)
5671	Yes	Assigned			Advanced Message Queuing Protocol (AMQP) over TLS
5672	Yes	Assigned	Yes		Advanced Message Queuing Protocol (AMQP)
5678	Unofficial	No			n8n
5678	No	Yes			MikroTik Neighbor Discovery Protocol
5683	Yes				Constrained Application Protocol (CoAP)
5684	Yes				Constrained Application Protocol Secure (CoAPs)
5693	Unofficial				Nagios Cross Platform Agent (NCPA)
5701	Unofficial				Hazelcast default communication port
5718	Unofficial				Microsoft DPM Data Channel (with the agent coordinator)
5719	Unofficial				Microsoft DPM Data Channel (with the protection agent)
5722	Yes				Microsoft RPC, DFSR (SYSVOL) Replication Service
5723	Unofficial				System Center Operations Manager
5724	Unofficial				Operations Manager Console
5741	Yes				IDA Discover Port 1
5742	Yes				IDA Discover Port 2
5800	Unofficial				VNC Remote Framebuffer (RFB) protocol over HTTP
5800	Unofficial				ProjectWise Server
5900	Yes				Remote Framebuffer (RFB) protocol
5900	Unofficial				VNC Remote Framebuffer (RFB) protocol
5905	Unofficial				Windows service "C:\Program Files\Intel\Intel(R) Online Connect Access\IntelTechnologyAccessService.exe" that listens on 127.0.0.1
5931	Yes				AMMYY admin Remote Control
5938	Unofficial				TeamViewer remote desktop protocol
5984	Yes				CouchDB database server
5985	Yes				Windows PowerShell Default psSession Port Windows Remote Management Service (WinRM-HTTP)
5986	Yes				Windows PowerShell Default psSession Port Windows Remote Management Service (WinRM-HTTPS)
5988–5989	Yes				CIM-XML (DMTF Protocol)
6000–6063	Yes				X11—used between an X client and server over the network
6005	Unofficial				Default for BMC Software Control-M/Server—Socket used for communication between Control-M processes—though often changed during installation
6005	Unofficial				Default for Camfrog chat & cam client
6009	Unofficial				JD Edwards EnterpriseOne ERP system JDENet messaging client listener
6024–6025		Unofficial			Tigermeeting Android client discovery
6026	Unofficial				Tigermeeting client/server communication
6030–6031		Unofficial			Tigermeeting Admin user discovery
6032	Unofficial				Tigermeeting API for cloud management – TigerDriver
6050	Unofficial				Arcserve backup
6051	Unofficial				Arcserve backup
6081		Yes			Generic Network Virtualization Encapsulation (Geneve)
6086	Yes				Peer Distributed Transfer Protocol (PDTP), FTP like file server in a P2P network
6100	Unofficial				Vizrt System
6100	Unofficial				Ventrilo authentication for version 3
6101	Unofficial				Backup Exec Agent Browser
6110	Yes				softcm, HP Softbench CM
6111	Yes				spc, HP Softbench Sub-Process Control
6112	Yes				dtspcd, execute commands and launch applications remotely
6112	Unofficial				Blizzard's Battle.net gaming service and some games, ArenaNet gaming service, Relic gaming service
6112	Unofficial				Club Penguin Disney online game for kids
6113	Unofficial				Club Penguin Disney online game for kids, Used by some Blizzard games
6121–6122	Unofficial				Lacewing networking extensions used in Clickteam Fusion.
6136	Unofficial				ObjectDB database server
6159	Yes				ARINC 840 EFB Application Control Interface
6160	Unofficial				Veeam Installer Service
6161	Unofficial				Veeam vPower NFS Service
6162	Unofficial				Veeam Data Mover
6163	Unofficial				Veeam Hyper-V Integration Service
6164	Unofficial				Veeam WAN Accelerator
6165	Unofficial				Veeam WAN Accelerator Data Transfer
6167	Unofficial				Veeam Log Shipping Service
6170	Unofficial				Veeam Mount Server
6200	Unofficial				Oracle WebCenter Content Portable: Content Server (With Native UI) and Inbound Refinery
6201	Assigned				Thermo-Calc Software AB: Management of service nodes in a processing grid for thermodynamic calculations
6201	Unofficial				Oracle WebCenter Content Portable: Admin
6225	Unofficial				Oracle WebCenter Content Portable: Content Server Web UI
6227	Unofficial				Oracle WebCenter Content Portable: JavaDB
6240	Unofficial				Oracle WebCenter Content Portable: Capture
6244	Unofficial				Oracle WebCenter Content Portable: Content Server—Intradoc Socket port
6255	Unofficial				Oracle WebCenter Content Portable: Inbound Refinery—Intradoc Socket port
6257		Unofficial			WinMX (see also 6699)
6260	Unofficial				planet M.U.L.E.
6262	Unofficial				Sybase Advantage Database Server
6343		Yes			SFlow, sFlow traffic monitoring
6346	Yes				gnutella-svc, gnutella (FrostWire, Limewire, Shareaza, etc.)
6347	Yes				gnutella-rtr, Gnutella alternate
6350	Yes				App Discovery and Access Protocol
6379	Yes				Redis key-value data store
6389	Unofficial				EMC CLARiiON
6432	Yes				PgBouncer—A connection pooler for PostgreSQL
6436	Unofficial				Leap Motion Websocket Server TLS
6437	Unofficial				Leap Motion Websocket Server
6443	Unofficial				Kubernetes API server
6444	Yes				Sun Grid Engine Qmaster Service
6445	Yes				Sun Grid Engine Execution Service
6454		Unofficial			Art-Net protocol
6463–6472	Unofficial				Discord RPC
6464	Yes				Port assignment for medical device communication in accordance to IEEE 11073-20701
6513	Yes				NETCONF over TLS
6514	Yes				Syslog over TLS
6515	Yes				Elipse RPC Protocol (REC)
6516	Unofficial				Windows Admin Center
6543	Unofficial				Pylons project#Pyramid Default Pylons Pyramid web service port
6556	Unofficial				Check MK Agent
6566	Yes				SANE (Scanner Access Now Easy)—SANE network scanner daemon
6560–6561	Unofficial				Speech-Dispatcher daemon
6567	Unofficial				Mindustry multiplayer server
6571	Unofficial				Windows Live FolderShare client
6600	Yes				Microsoft Hyper-V Live
6600	Unofficial				Music Player Daemon (MPD)
6601	Yes				Microsoft Forefront Threat Management Gateway
6602	Yes				Microsoft Windows WSS Communication
6610	Yes				Bencher API
6619	Yes				odette-ftps, Odette File Transfer Protocol (OFTP) over TLS/SSL
6622	Yes				Multicast FTP
6626	Yes				Semaphore Messenger
6653	Yes	Assigned			OpenFlow
6660–6664	Unofficial				Internet Relay Chat (IRC)
6665–6669	Yes				Internet Relay Chat (IRC)
6679	Yes				Osorno Automation Protocol (OSAUT)
6679	Unofficial				Internet Relay Chat (IRC) SSL (Secure Internet Relay Chat)—often used
6690	Unofficial				Synology Cloud station
6697	Yes				IRC SSL (Secure Internet Relay Chat)—often used
6699	Unofficial				WinMX (see also 6257)
6715	Unofficial				AberMUD and derivatives default port
6771		Unofficial			BitTorrent Local Peer Discovery
6783–6785	Unofficial				Splashtop Remote server broadcast
6789	Unofficial				Ubiquiti UniFi Network server mobile speed test
6801	Yes				ACNET Control System Protocol
6881–6887	Unofficial				BitTorrent beginning of range of ports used most often
6888	Yes				MUSE
6888	Unofficial				BitTorrent continuation of range of ports used most often
6889–6900	Unofficial				BitTorrent continuation of range of ports used most often
6891–6900	Unofficial				Windows Live Messenger (File transfer)
6901	Unofficial				Windows Live Messenger (Voice)
6901	Unofficial				BitTorrent continuation of range of ports used most often
6902–6968	Unofficial				BitTorrent continuation of range of ports used most often
6924	Yes				split-ping, ping with RX/TX latency/loss split
6935	Yes				EthoScan Service
6936	Yes				XenSource Management Service
6969	Yes				acmsoda
6969	Unofficial				BitTorrent tracker
6970–6999	Unofficial				BitTorrent end of range of ports used most often
6970–6999		Unofficial			QuickTime Streaming Server
6980		Unofficial			Voicemeeter VBAN network audio protocol
7000	Unofficial				Default for Vuze's built-in HTTPS Bittorrent tracker
7000	Unofficial				Avira Server Management Console
7000	Unofficial				Default for MAGICS remote license server
7000	Yes				IRC SSL (Secure Internet Relay Chat)—often used
7001	Unofficial				Avira Server Management Console
7001	Unofficial				Default for BEA WebLogic Server's HTTP server, though often changed during installation
7001	Unofficial				Default for Network Optix as well as their whilelabel branded systems, providing service both on http and deployed client for video surveillance system.
7002	Unofficial				Default for BEA WebLogic Server's HTTPS server, though often changed during installation
7005	Unofficial				Default for BMC Software Control-M/Server and Control-M/Agent for Agent-to-Server, though often changed during installation
7006	Unofficial				Default for BMC Software Control-M/Server and Control-M/Agent for Server-to-Agent, though often changed during installation
7010	Unofficial				Default for Cisco AON AMC (AON Management Console)
7010	Unofficial				Default for MAGICS remote license server
7022	Unofficial				MSSQL Server Replication and Database mirroring endpoints
7023		Yes			T2-NMCS Protocol for SatCom Modems
7025	Unofficial				Zimbra LMTP [mailbox]—local mail delivery
7047	Unofficial				Zimbra conversion server
7070	Unofficial				Real Time Streaming Protocol (RTSP), used by QuickTime Streaming Server. TCP is used by default, UDP is used as an alternate.
7077	Yes				Development-Network Authentification-Protocol
7133	Unofficial				Enemy Territory: Quake Wars
7144	Unofficial				Peercast
7145	Unofficial				Peercast
7171	Unofficial				Tibia
7262	Yes				CNAP (Calypso Network Access Protocol)
7272	Yes				WatchMe – WatchMe Monitoring
7306	Unofficial				Zimbra mysql [mailbox]
7307	Unofficial				Zimbra mysql [logger]
7312		Unofficial			Sibelius License Server
7396	Unofficial				Web control interface for Folding@home v7.3.6 and later
7400	Yes				RTPS (Real Time Publish Subscribe) DDS Discovery
7401	Yes				RTPS (Real Time Publish Subscribe) DDS User-Traffic
7402	Yes				RTPS (Real Time Publish Subscribe) DDS Meta-Traffic
7471	Unofficial				Stateless Transport Tunneling (STT)
7473	Yes				Rise: The Vieneo Province
7474	Yes				Neo4J Server webadmin
7478	Yes				Default port used by Open iT Server.
7542	Yes				Saratoga file transfer protocol
7547	Yes				CPE WAN Management Protocol (CWMP) Technical Report 069
7575		Unofficial			Populous: The Beginning server
7624	Yes				Instrument Neutral Distributed Interface
7631	Yes				ERLPhase
7634	Unofficial				hddtemp—Utility to monitor hard drive temperature
7652–7654	Unofficial				I2P anonymizing overlay network
7655		Unofficial			I2P SAM Bridge Socket API
7656–7660	Unofficial				I2P anonymizing overlay network
7659	Unofficial				Polypheny User Interface (database system)
7670	Unofficial				BrettspielWelt BSW Boardgame Portal
7680	Unofficial				Delivery Optimization for Windows 10
7687	Yes				Bolt database connection
7707–7708		Unofficial			Killing Floor
7717		Unofficial			Killing Floor
7745	Unofficial				HomeBox
7777	Unofficial				iChat server file transfer proxy
7777	Unofficial				Oracle Cluster File System 2
7777	Unofficial				Windows backdoor program tini.exe default
7777	Unofficial				Just Cause 2: Multiplayer Mod Server
7777	Unofficial				Terraria default server
7777	Unofficial	Unofficial			Super Foosball multiplayer gameplay port
7777		Unofficial			San Andreas Multiplayer (SA-MP) default port server
7777		Unofficial			SCP: Secret Laboratory Multiplayer Server
7777–7788	Yes				Steam common default game server ports (Ark, L4D2, etc.)
7777–7788	Unofficial				Unreal Tournament series default server
7831	Unofficial				Default used by Smartlaunch Internet Cafe Administration software
7880	Yes				PowerSchool Gradebook Server
7890	Unofficial				Default that will be used by the iControl Internet Cafe Suite Administration software
7915	Unofficial				Default for YSFlight server
7935	Unofficial				Fixed port used for Adobe Flash Debug Player to communicate with a debugger (Flash IDE, Flex Builder or fdb).
7946	Unofficial				Docker Swarm communication among nodes
7979		Unofficial			Used by SilverBluff Studios for communication between servers and clients.
7990	Unofficial				Atlassian Bitbucket (default port)
8000	Unofficial				Deno
8000	Unofficial				Commonly used for Internet radio streams such as SHOUTcast, Icecast and iTunes Radio
8000	Unofficial				DynamoDB Local
8000	Unofficial				Django Development Webserver
8000	Unofficial				Python 3 http.server
8005	Unofficial				Tomcat remote shutdown
8005	Unofficial				PLATO ASCII protocol (RFC 600)
8005	Unofficial				Windows SCCM HTTP listener service
8006	Unofficial				Quest AppAssure 5 API
8006	Unofficial	No			Proxmox Virtual Environment admin web interface
8007	Unofficial				Quest AppAssure 5 Engine
8007	Yes				Proxmox Backup Server admin web interface
8008	Unofficial				Alternative port for HTTP. See also ports 80 and 8080.
8008	Unofficial				IBM HTTP Server administration default
8008	Unofficial				iCal, a calendar application by Apple
8008	Unofficial	No			Matrix homeserver federation over HTTP
8009	Unofficial				Apache JServ Protocol (ajp13)
8010	Unofficial	No			Buildbot web status page
8042	Unofficial				Orthanc – REST API over HTTP
8061	Yes	Reserved			Nikatron Device Protocol (nikatron-dev)
8069	Unofficial				OpenERP 5.0 XML-RPC protocol
8070	Unofficial				OpenERP 5.0 NET-RPC protocol
8074	Yes				Gadu-Gadu
8075	Unofficial				Killing Floor web administration interface
8080	Yes				Alternative port for HTTP. See also ports 80 and 8008.
8080	Unofficial				Apache Tomcat
8080	Unofficial				Atlassian JIRA applications
8081	Yes				Sun Proxy Admin Service
8088	Unofficial				Asterisk management access via HTTP
8088	Unofficial				YARN ResourceManager Web UI
8089	Unofficial	No			Splunk daemon management
8089	Unofficial				Fritz!Box automatic TR-069 configuration
8090	Unofficial				Atlassian Confluence
8090	Unofficial				Coral Content Distribution Network (legacy; 80 and 8080 now supported)
8090	Unofficial				Matrix identity server
8091	Unofficial				CouchBase web administration
8092	Unofficial				CouchBase API
8093	Unofficial				GitLab Runner session server
8096	Unofficial				Emby and Jellyfin HTTP port
8100	Unofficial				SaltoSystems – Pro Access Space Service
8100	Unofficial				BlueMap, a 3D Minecraft web viewer and mapping tool
8102	Unofficial				SaltoSystems – Used for LocalIO-Bridge for USB-Devices
8111	Unofficial				JOSM Remote Control
8112	Unofficial				PAC Pacifica Coin
8116		Unofficial			Check Point Cluster Control Protocol
8118	Yes				Privoxy—advertisement-filtering Web proxy
8123	Unofficial				Polipo Web proxy
8123	Unofficial				Home Assistant Home automation
8123	Unofficial				Minecraft Dynmap plugin/mod
8123	Unofficial				ClickHouse HTTP interface default port
8125	Unofficial				StatsD server
8139	Unofficial				Puppet (software) Client agent
8140	Yes				Puppet (software) Master server
8172	Unofficial				Microsoft Remote Administration for IIS Manager
8181–8186	Unofficial				FRITZ!Box services
8182	Unofficial				NexusM Media Server HTTP port
8184	Unofficial				NCSA Brown Dog Data Access Proxy
8188	Unofficial				ComfyUI Web Interface
8194–8195	Yes				Bloomberg Terminal
8200	Unofficial				GoToMyPC
8200	Unofficial				MiniDLNA media server Web Interface
8200	Unofficial				Elastic APM Server
8222	Unofficial				VMware VI Web Access via HTTP
8236	Unofficial				jRCS listener for Rocket Software jBASE Remote Connectivity Server
8243	Yes				HTTPS listener for Apache Synapse
8245	Unofficial				Dynamic DNS for at least No-IP and DynDNS
8280	Yes				HTTP listener for Apache Synapse
8281	Unofficial				HTTP Listener for Gatecraft Plugin
8291	Unofficial				WinBox: Mikrotik RouterOS GUI Configurator
8303		Unofficial			Teeworlds Server
8322	Assigned				Garmin Marine
8332	Unofficial				Bitcoin JSON-RPC server
8333	Unofficial				Bitcoin
8333	Unofficial				VMware VI Web Access via HTTPS
8334	Unofficial				Filestash server (default)
8335	Unofficial				DBCalm Open
8337	Unofficial				VisualSVN Distributed File System Service (VDFS)
8384	Unofficial				Syncthing web GUI
8388	Unofficial				Shadowsocks proxy server
8400	Yes				Commvault Communications Service (GxCVD, found in all client computers)
8401	Yes				Commvault Server Event Manager (GxEvMgrS, available in CommServe)
8403	Yes				Commvault Firewall (GxFWD, tunnel port for HTTP/HTTPS)
8443	Unofficial				SW Soft Plesk Control Panel
8443	Unofficial				Apache Tomcat SSL
8443	Unofficial				Promise WebPAM SSL
8443	Unofficial				iCal over SSL
8443	Unofficial				MineOs WebUi
8443	Unofficial				ClickHouse HTTPS interface default port
8444	Unofficial				Bitmessage
8444	Unofficial				Chia
8448	Yes				Matrix homeserver federation over HTTPS
8484	Unofficial				MapleStory Login Server
8500	Unofficial				Adobe ColdFusion built-in web server
8501	Unofficial				Streamlit Open-source Python framework for machine learning and data science
8530	Unofficial				Windows Server Update Services over HTTP, when using the default role installation settings in Windows Server 2012 and later versions.
8531	Unofficial				Windows Server Update Services over HTTPS, when using the default role installation settings in Windows Server 2012 and later versions.
8555	Unofficial				Symantec DLP OCR Engine
8555	Unofficial				Chia JSON-RPC server
8580	Unofficial				Freegate, an Internet anonymizer and proxy tool
8601	Unofficial				Wavestore VMS protocol
8611–8614	Yes				Canon BubbleJet Network Protocol
8629	Unofficial				Tibero database
8642	Unofficial				Lotus Notes Traveler auto synchronization for Windows Mobile and Nokia devices
8691	Unofficial				Ultra Fractal, a fractal generation and rendering software application – distributed calculations over networked computers
8728	Unofficial				MikroTik RouterOS API
8729	Unofficial				MikroTik RouterOS API-SSL
8765	Unofficial	No			Default port of a local GUN relay peer that the Internet Archive and others use as a decentralized mirror for censorship resistance.
8767		Unofficial			Voice channel of TeamSpeak 2, a proprietary Voice over IP protocol targeted at gamers
8787	Unofficial				Cloudflare Workers development default
8834	Unofficial				Nessus, a vulnerability scanner – remote XML-RPC web server
8840	Unofficial				Opera Unite, an extensible framework for web applications
8880	Yes				Alternate port of CDDB (Compact Disc Database) protocol, used to look up audio CD (compact disc) information over the Internet. See also port 888.
8880	Unofficial				IBM WebSphere Application Server SOAP connector
8883	Yes				Secure MQTT (MQTT over TLS)
8887	Unofficial				HyperVM over HTTP
8888	Unofficial				HyperVM over HTTPS
8888	Unofficial	No			Freenet web UI (localhost only)
8888	Unofficial				Default for IPython / Jupyter notebook dashboards
8888	Unofficial				MAMP
8889	Unofficial				MAMP
8920	Unofficial				Jellyfin HTTPS port
8971	Unofficial				Frigate NVR authenticated UI & API
8983	Unofficial				Apache Solr
8997	Unofficial				Alternate port for I2P Monotone Proxy
8998	Unofficial				I2P Monotone Proxy
8999	Unofficial				Alternate port for I2P Monotone Proxy
9000	Unofficial				SonarQube Web Server
9000	Unofficial				ClickHouse native interface default port
9000	Unofficial				DBGp
9000	Unofficial				SqueezeCenter web server & streaming
9000		Unofficial			UDPCast
9000	Unofficial				Play Framework web server
9000	Unofficial				Hadoop NameNode default port
9000	Unofficial				PHP-FPM default port
9000	Unofficial				qBittorrent's embedded torrent tracker default port
9000	Unofficial				Emidate
9001	Yes				ETL Service Manager
9001	Unofficial				Microsoft SharePoint authoring environment
9001	Unofficial				cisco-xremote router configuration
9001	Unofficial				Tor network default (ORPort)
9001	Unofficial				DBGp Proxy
9001	Unofficial				HSQLDB default port
9001	Unofficial				Emidate
9002	Unofficial				Newforma Server comms
9002	Unofficial				Emidate
9003	Unofficial				Xdebug default client port
9006	Unofficial				Tomcat in standalone mode
9008	Unofficial				Zerto VRA encrypted communications listener
9030	Unofficial				Tor network default (DirPort)
9042	Unofficial				Apache Cassandra native protocol clients
9043	Unofficial				WebSphere Application Server Administration Console secure
9050–9051	Unofficial				Tor (SOCKS-5 proxy)
9060	Unofficial				WebSphere Application Server Administration Console
9080	Yes				glrpc, Groove Collaboration software GLRPC
9080	Unofficial				WebSphere Application Server HTTP Transport (port 1) default
9080	Unofficial				Remote Potato by FatAttitude, Windows Media Center addon
9080	Unofficial				ServerWMC, Windows Media Center addon
9081	Unofficial				Zerto ZVM to ZVM communication
9090	Unofficial				Cockpit
9090	Unofficial				Prometheus metrics server
9090	Unofficial				Openfire Administration console
9090	Unofficial				SqueezeCenter control (CLI)
9090	Unofficial				Cherokee Admin panel
9091	Unofficial				Openfire Administration console (SSL secured)
9091	Unofficial				Transmission (BitTorrent client) Web interface
9092	Unofficial				H2 (DBMS) Database server
9092	Unofficial				Apache Kafka A Distributed Streaming Platform
9095	Unofficial				Networker Web user interface server
9100	Yes	Assigned			PDL Data Stream, used for printing to certain network printers
9101	Yes				Bacula Director
9102	Yes				Bacula File Daemon
9103	Yes				Bacula Storage Daemon
9116	Unofficial				SNMP-exporter (Prometheus)
9119	Yes				MXit Instant Messenger
9150	Unofficial				Tor browser
9191	Unofficial				Sierra Wireless Airlink
9199	Unofficial				Avtex LLC—qStats
9200	Unofficial				Elasticsearch—default Elasticsearch port
9217	Unofficial				iPass Platform Service
9229	Unofficial				NodeJS debugging default port (localhost)
9293	Unofficial				Sony PlayStation RemotePlay
9295	Unofficial				Sony PlayStation Remote Play Session creation communication port
9296		Unofficial			Sony PlayStation Remote Play
9297		Unofficial			Sony PlayStation Remote Play Video stream
9300	Unofficial				IBM Cognos BI
9303		Unofficial			D-Link Shareport Share storage and MFP printers
9306	Yes				Sphinx Native API
9309	Unofficial				Sony PlayStation Vita Host Collaboration WiFi Data Transfer
9312	Yes				Sphinx SphinxQL
9332	Unofficial				Litecoin JSON-RPC server
9333	Unofficial				Litecoin
9339	Unofficial				Used by all Supercell games such as Brawl Stars and Clash of Clans, mobile freemium strategy video games
9389	Yes				adws, Microsoft AD DS Web Services, Powershell uses this port
9392	Unofficial	No			OpenVAS Greenbone Security Assistant web interface
9418	Yes				git, Git pack transfer service
9419	Unofficial				MooseFS distributed file system – master control port
9420	Unofficial				MooseFS distributed file system – master command port
9421	Unofficial				MooseFS distributed file system – master client port
9422	Unofficial				MooseFS distributed file system – Chunkservers
9425	Unofficial				MooseFS distributed file system – CGI server
9443	Unofficial				VMware Websense Triton console (HTTPS port used for accessing and administrating a vCenter Server via the Web Management Interface)
9443	Unofficial				NCSA Brown Dog Data Tilling Service
9535	Yes				mngsuite, LANDesk Management Suite Remote Control
9536	Yes				laes-bf, IP Fabrics Surveillance buffering function
9600	No	Unofficial			Factory Interface Network Service (FINS), a network protocol used by Omron programmable logic controllers
9669	Unofficial	No			VGG Image Search Engine VISE
9675	Unofficial				Spiceworks Desktop, IT Helpdesk Software
9676	Unofficial				Spiceworks Desktop, IT Helpdesk Software
9695	Yes				Content centric networking (CCN, CCNx)
9735	Unofficial				Bitcoin Lightning Network
9761	Unofficial				Roboteq Motor controller
9785	Unofficial				Viber
9800	Yes				WebDAV Source
9800	Unofficial				WebCT e-learning portal
9875	Unofficial				Club Penguin Disney online game for kids
9876		Unofficial			V Rising Dedicated server
9877	Unofficial				V Rising Dedicated server
9898	Unofficial				Tripwire—File Integrity Monitoring Software
9899		Yes			SCTP tunneling (port number used in SCTP packets encapsulated in UDP, RFC 6951)
9901	Unofficial				Banana for Apache Solr
9911	Unofficial				Curecoin
9981	Unofficial				Tvheadend HTTP server (web interface)
9982	Unofficial				Tvheadend HTSP server (Streaming protocol)
9987	Unofficial	No			TeamSpeak 3 server default (voice) port (for the conflicting service see the IANA list)
9993		Unofficial			ZeroTier Default port for ZeroTier
9997	Unofficial				Splunk port for communication between the forwarders and indexers
9999	Unofficial				Urchin Web Analytics
9999	Unofficial				Dash (cryptocurrency)
10000	Yes				Network Data Management Protocol (NDMP) Control stream for network backup and restore.
10000	Unofficial				BackupExec
10000	Unofficial				Webmin, Web-based Unix/Linux system administration tool (default port)
10000–20000	No	Unofficial			Used on VoIP networks for receiving and transmitting voice telephony traffic which includes Google Voice via the OBiTalk ATA devices as well as on the MagicJack and Vonage ATA network devices.
10001		Unofficial			Ubiquiti UniFi access points broadcast to 255.255.255.255:10001 (UDP) to locate the controller(s)
10009	Unofficial				Crossfire, a multiplayer online First Person Shooter
10011	Unofficial	No			TeamSpeak 3 ServerQuery
10022	Unofficial	No			TeamSpeak 3 ServerQuery over SSH
10024	Unofficial				Zimbra smtp [mta]—to amavis from postfix
10025	Unofficial				Zimbra smtp [mta]—back to postfix from amavis
10042	Unofficial				Mathoid server
10050	Yes				Zabbix agent
10051	Yes				Zabbix trapper
10101	Unofficial				arx Compressed file transfer protocol.
10110	Yes				NMEA 0183 Navigational Data. Transport of NMEA 0183 sentences over TCP or UDP
10172	Unofficial				Intuit Quickbooks client
10200	Unofficial				FRISK Software International's fpscand virus scanning daemon for Unix platforms
10200	Unofficial				FRISK Software International's f-protd virus scanning daemon for Unix platforms
10200	Unofficial				Wyoming protocol (Text-to-Speech)
10201–10204	Unofficial				FRISK Software International's f-protd virus scanning daemon for Unix platforms
10212	Yes				GE Intelligent Platforms Proficy HMI/SCADA – CIMPLICITY WebView
10308	Unofficial				Digital Combat Simulator Dedicated Server
10346	No				TEKWorx Limited – interfaceIT board protocol
10468		Unofficial			Flyer – discovery protocol
10480	Unofficial				SWAT 4 Dedicated Server
10505		Unofficial			BlueStacks (android simulator) broadcast
10514	Unofficial				TLS-enabled Rsyslog (default by convention)
10578	Unofficial	No			Skyrim Together multiplayer server for The Elder Scrolls V: Skyrim mod.
10800	Unofficial				Touhou versus games (Immaterial and Missing Power, Phantasmagoria of Flower View, Scarlet Weather Rhapsody, Hisoutensoku, Hopeless Masquerade and Urban Legend in Limbo)
10801		Unofficial			Bag With Friends multiplayer server for the Peaks of Yore mod.
10823		Unofficial			Farming Simulator 2025
10891	Unofficial				Jungle Disk (this port is opened by the Jungle Disk Monitor service on the localhost)
10933	Yes	No			Octopus Deploy Tentacle deployment agent
11000	No	Unofficial			University of Utah CS3500 Software Practice
11100	No	Unofficial			Risk of Rain multiplayer server
11111	Unofficial				RiCcI, Remote Configuration Interface (Redhat Linux)
11112	Yes				ACR/NEMA Digital Imaging and Communications in Medicine
11211	Unofficial				memcached
11214	Unofficial				memcached incoming SSL proxy
11215	Unofficial				memcached internal outgoing SSL proxy
11235	Yes				XCOMPUTE numerical systems messaging (Xplicit Computing)
11311	Unofficial				Robot Operating System master
11371	Yes				OpenPGP HTTP key server
11434	Unofficial				Ollama to run LLM locally
11435		Unofficial			vertex (Internal AI Manager) to run LLM Locally
11753	Unofficial				OpenRCT2 multiplayer
12000	Unofficial				CubeForm, Multiplayer SandBox Game
12012		Unofficial			Audition Online Dance Battle, Korea Server—Status/Version Check
12013	Unofficial				Audition Online Dance Battle, Korea Server
12035		Unofficial			Second Life, used for server UDP in-bound
12043	Unofficial				Second Life, used for LSL HTTPS in-bound
12046	Unofficial				Second Life, used for LSL HTTP in-bound
12201	Unofficial				Graylog Extended Log Format (GELF)
12222		Yes			Light Weight Access Point Protocol (LWAPP) LWAPP data (RFC 5412)
12223		Yes			Light Weight Access Point Protocol (LWAPP) LWAPP control (RFC 5412)
12307		Unofficial			Makerbot UDP Broadcast (client to printer) (JSON-RPC)
12308		Unofficial			Makerbot UDP Broadcast (printer to client) (JSON-RPC)
12345	Unofficial				Cube World
12345	Unofficial				Little Fighter 2
12345	Unofficial				NetBus remote administration tool (often Trojan horse).
12443	Unofficial				IBM HMC web browser management access over HTTPS instead of default port 443
12489	Unofficial				NSClient/NSClient++/NC_Net (Nagios)
12975	Unofficial				LogMeIn Hamachi (VPN tunnel software; also port 32976)—used to connect to Mediation Server (bibi.hamachi.cc); will attempt to use SSL (TCP port 443) if both 12975 & 32976 fail to connect
13000–13050		Unofficial			Second Life, used for server UDP in-bound
13008	Unofficial				Crossfire, a multiplayer online First Person Shooter
13075	Yes				Default for BMC Software Control-M/Enterprise Manager Corba communication, though often changed during installation
13400	Yes				ISO 13400 Road vehicles — Diagnostic communication over Internet Protocol (DoIP)
13720	Yes				Symantec NetBackup—bprd (formerly VERITAS)
13721	Yes				Symantec NetBackup—bpdbm (formerly VERITAS)
13724	Yes				Symantec Network Utility—vnetd (formerly VERITAS)
13782	Yes				Symantec NetBackup—bpcd (formerly VERITAS)
13783	Yes				Symantec VOPIED protocol (formerly VERITAS)
13785	Yes				Symantec NetBackup Database—nbdb (formerly VERITAS)
13786	Yes				Symantec nomdb (formerly VERITAS)
14550		Unofficial			MAVLink Ground Station Port
14567		Unofficial			Battlefield 1942 and mods
14652	Unofficial				Repgen DoxBox reporting tool
14800	Unofficial				Age of Wonders III p2p port
15000	Unofficial				psyBNC
15000	Unofficial				Wesnoth
15000	Unofficial				Kaspersky Network Agent
15000		Unofficial			Teltonika networks remote management system (RMS)
15009	Unofficial				Teltonika networks remote management system (RMS)
15010	Unofficial				Teltonika networks remote management system (RMS)
15441	Unofficial				ZeroNet fileserver
15567		Unofficial			Battlefield Vietnam and mods
15345	Yes				XPilot Contact
15672	Unofficial	No			RabbitMQ management plugin
16000	Unofficial				Oracle WebCenter Content: Imaging (formerly known as Oracle Universal Content Management). Port though often changed during installation
16000	Unofficial				shroudBNC
16080	Unofficial				macOS Server Web (HTTP) service with performance cache
16200	Unofficial				Oracle WebCenter Content: Content Server (formerly known as Oracle Universal Content Management). Port though often changed during installation
16225	Unofficial				Oracle WebCenter Content: Content Server Web UI. Port though often changed during installation
16250	Unofficial				Oracle WebCenter Content: Inbound Refinery (formerly known as Oracle Universal Content Management). Port though often changed during installation
16261	Unofficial				Project Zomboid multiplayer. Additional sequential ports used for each player connecting to server.
16300	Unofficial				Oracle WebCenter Content: Records Management (formerly known as Oracle Universal Records Management). Port though often changed during installation
16379	Unofficial				Redis Cluster bus
16384		Unofficial			CISCO Default RTP MIN
16384–16403		Unofficial			Real-time Transport Protocol (RTP), RTP Control Protocol (RTCP), used by Apple's iChat for audio and video
16384–16387		Unofficial			Real-time Transport Protocol (RTP), RTP Control Protocol (RTCP), used by Apple's FaceTime and Game Center
16393–16402		Unofficial			Real-time Transport Protocol (RTP), RTP Control Protocol (RTCP), used by Apple's FaceTime and Game Center
16403–16472		Unofficial			Real-time Transport Protocol (RTP), RTP Control Protocol (RTCP), used by Apple's Game Center
16400	Unofficial				Oracle WebCenter Content: Capture (formerly known as Oracle Document Capture). Port though often changed during installation
16567		Unofficial			Battlefield 2 and mods
17000		Unofficial			M17 – Digital RF voice and data protocol with Internet (UDP) gateways (reflectors).
17011	Unofficial				Worms multiplayer
17224	Yes				Train Realtime Data Protocol (TRDP) Process Data, network protocol used in train communication.
17225	Yes				Train Realtime Data Protocol (TRDP) Message Data, network protocol used in train communication.
17333	Unofficial				CS Server (CSMS), default binary protocol port
17472	Unofficial				Tanium Communication Port
17474		Unofficial			DMXControl 3 Network Discovery
17475	Unofficial				DMXControl 3 Network Broker
17476	Unofficial				DMXControl 3 Network Broker TLS
17500	Yes				Dropbox LanSync Protocol (db-lsp); used to synchronize file catalogs between Dropbox clients on a local network.
17779		Unofficial			AISMixer UDPSEC, a project-specific authenticated and encrypted UDP transport for AIS NMEA 0183 streams between nmea_sproxy stations and the aismixer service.
18080	Unofficial	No			Monero P2P network communications
18081	Unofficial	No			Monero incoming RPC calls
18091	Unofficial				memcached Internal REST HTTPS for SSL
18092	Unofficial				memcached Internal CAPI HTTPS for SSL
18104	Yes				RAD PDF Service
18200	Unofficial				Audition Online Dance Battle, AsiaSoft Thailand Server status/version check
18201	Unofficial				Audition Online Dance Battle, AsiaSoft Thailand Server
18206	Unofficial				Audition Online Dance Battle, AsiaSoft Thailand Server FAM database
18300	Unofficial				Audition Online Dance Battle, AsiaSoft SEA Server status/version check
18301	Unofficial				Audition Online Dance Battle, AsiaSoft SEA Server
18306	Unofficial				Audition Online Dance Battle, AsiaSoft SEA Server FAM database
18333	Unofficial				Bitcoin testnet
18400	Unofficial				Audition Online Dance Battle, KAIZEN Brazil Server status/version check
18401	Unofficial				Audition Online Dance Battle, KAIZEN Brazil Server
18505	Unofficial				Audition Online Dance Battle R4p3 Server, Nexon Server status/version check
18506	Unofficial				Audition Online Dance Battle, Nexon Server
18605	Unofficial				X-BEAT status/version check
18606	Unofficial				X-BEAT
18676	Unofficial				YouView
18769	Yes				iQue Protocol
18789	Unofficial				OpenClaw Gateway
19000	Unofficial				Audition Online Dance Battle, G10/alaplaya Server status/version check
19000		Unofficial			JACK sound server
19001	Unofficial				Audition Online Dance Battle, G10/alaplaya Server
19132		Unofficial			Minecraft: Bedrock Edition multiplayer server
19133		Unofficial			Minecraft: Bedrock Edition IPv6 multiplayer server
19150	Unofficial				Gkrellm Server
19226	Unofficial				Panda Software AdminSecure Communication Agent
19294	Unofficial				Google Talk Voice and Video connections
19295		Unofficial			Google Talk Voice and Video connections
19302		Unofficial			Google Talk Voice and Video connections
19531	Unofficial	No			systemd-journal-gatewayd
19532	Unofficial	No			systemd-journal-remote
19788	No	Yes			Mesh Link Establishment protocol for IEEE 802.15.4 radio mesh networks
19771	Unofficial				Softros LAN Messenger uses TCP and UDP ports for collecting user lists and sending messages
19812	Yes	No			4D database SQL Communication
19813	Yes				4D database Client Server Communication
19814	Yes				4D database DB4D Communication
19818	Unofficial	Unofficial			Vereign mesh network. Client-to-client data transfer over secure direct tunnel. It uses TCP and UDP
19880	Unofficial				Softros LAN Messenger uses TCP port for file transfers
19999	Yes				Distributed Network Protocol—Secure (DNP—Secure), a secure version of the protocol used in SCADA systems between communicating RTU's and IED's
20000	Yes				Distributed Network Protocol (DNP), a protocol used in SCADA systems between communicating RTU's and IED's
20000	Yes				OpenWebNet, communications protocol used in Bticino products
20000	Unofficial				Usermin, Web-based Unix/Linux user administration tool (default port)
20000	Unofficial				Used on VoIP networks for receiving and transmitting voice telephony traffic which includes Google Voice via the OBiTalk ATA devices as well as on the MagicJack and Vonage ATA network devices.
20560	Unofficial				Killing Floor
20580	Unofficial	Unofficial			Walljam device communications
20581	Unofficial	Unofficial			Walljam device communications
20595		Unofficial			0 A.D. Empires Ascendant
20808		Unofficial			Ableton Link
21025	Unofficial				Starbound Server (default), Starbound
21064	Unofficial				Default Ingres DBMS server
22000	Unofficial				Syncthing (default)
22067	Unofficial				Syncthing Relay Server (strelaysrv)
22070	Unofficial				Syncthing Relay Server (strelaysrv) – Status service
22136	Unofficial				FLIR Systems Camera Resource Protocol
22222	Unofficial				Davis Instruments, WeatherLink IP
22347	Yes				WibuKey, WIBU-SYSTEMS AG Copy protection
22350	Yes				CodeMeter, WIBU-SYSTEMS AG Copy protection
22351	Yes				CodeMeter-CmWAN, WIBU-SYSTEMS AG Copy protection
23073	Unofficial				Soldat Dedicated Server
23399	Unofficial				Skype default protocol
23513	Unofficial				Duke Nukem 3D source ports
24441	Unofficial				Pyzor spam detection network
24444	Unofficial				NetBeans integrated development environment
24454		Unofficial			Minecraft (Java Edition) Simple Voice Chat mod voice server
24465	Yes				Tonido Directory Server for Tonido which is a Personal Web App and P2P platform
24554	Yes				BINKP, Fidonet mail transfers over TCP/IP
24576		Unofficial			MINT Protocol used for Motorola, Zebra, and Extreme Networks wireless.
24800	Unofficial				Synergy: keyboard/mouse sharing software
24842	Unofficial				StepMania: Online: Dance Dance Revolution Simulator
25565	Unofficial				Minecraft (Java Edition) multiplayer server
25565		Unofficial			Minecraft (Java Edition) multiplayer server query
25575	Unofficial				Minecraft (Java Edition) multiplayer server RCON
25585	Unofficial				Minecraft (Java Edition) multiplayer server management
25734–25735	Unofficial				SolidWorks SolidNetworkLicense Manager
25826		Unofficial			collectd default port
26000	Yes				id Software's Quake server
26000	Unofficial				EVE Online, iVentoy webGUI (see Ventoy)
26000		Unofficial			Xonotic, an open-source arena shooter
26822		Unofficial			MSI MysticLight
26900–26901	Unofficial				EVE Online
26909–26911	Unofficial				Action Tanks Online
27000	Unofficial				PowerBuilder SySAM license server
27000–27006		Unofficial			id Software's QuakeWorld master server
27000–27009	Yes				FlexNet Publisher's License server (from the range of default ports)
27000–27015	No	Unofficial			Steam (game client traffic)
27015	No	Unofficial			GoldSrc, Source engine and Source 2 engine dedicated server port
27015–27018		Unofficial			Unturned, a survival game
27015–27030	No	Unofficial			Steam (matchmaking and HLTV)
27015–27030	Unofficial				Steam (downloads)
27016	Unofficial				Magicka and Space Engineers server port
27017	Unofficial	No			MongoDB daemon process (mongod) and routing service (mongos)
27031–27035	No	Unofficial			Steam (In-Home Streaming)
27036	Unofficial				Steam (In-Home Streaming)
27100	Unofficial				Screen Play Games controller
27374	Unofficial				Sub7 default.
27500–27900		Unofficial			id Software's QuakeWorld
27888		Unofficial			Kaillera server
27901–27910		Unofficial			id Software's Quake II master server
27950		Unofficial			OpenArena outgoing
27960–27969		Unofficial			Activision's Enemy Territory and id Software's Quake III Arena, Quake III and Quake Live and some ioquake3 derived games, such as Urban Terror (OpenArena incoming)
28000	Yes				Siemens Digital Industries Software license server
28001	Unofficial				Starsiege: Tribes
28015		Unofficial			Rust (video game)
28016		Unofficial			Rust (video game) RCON
28200	Assigned				VoxelStorm game server
28260	Unofficial				Palo Alto Networks' Panorama HA-1 backup unencrypted sync port.
28443	Unofficial				Palo Alto Networks' Panorama-to-managed devices software updates, PAN-OS 8.0 and later.
28769	Unofficial				Palo Alto Networks' Panorama HA unencrypted sync port.
28770	Unofficial				Palo Alto Networks' Panorama HA-1 backup sync port.
28770–28771		Unofficial			AssaultCube Reloaded, a video game based upon a modification of AssaultCube
28785–28786		Unofficial			Cube 2: Sauerbraten
28852	Unofficial				Killing Floor
28910	Unofficial				Nintendo Wi-Fi Connection
28960	Unofficial				Call of Duty; Call of Duty: United Offensive; Call of Duty 2; Call of Duty 4: Modern Warfare Call of Duty: World at War (PC platform)
29000	Yes				Siemens Digital Industries Software license server
29070	Unofficial				Jedi Knight: Jedi Academy by Ravensoft
29900–29901	Unofficial				Nintendo Wi-Fi Connection
29920	Unofficial				Nintendo Wi-Fi Connection
30000		Unofficial			XLink Kai P2P
30000		Unofficial			Luanti server default port
30000		Unofficial			Foundry Virtual Tabletop server default port
30003	Yes	Yes			Amicon FPSU-IP Remote Administration
30004	Yes	Yes			Amicon FPSU-IP VPN
30033	Unofficial	No			TeamSpeak 3 File Transfer
30120	Unofficial				FiveM (Default Port) GTA V multiplayer
30564	Unofficial				Multiplicity: keyboard/mouse/clipboard sharing software
30814	Unofficial				BeamMP: Unofficial BeamNG.drive multiplayer mod. Default server port
31337	Unofficial				Back Orifice and Back Orifice 2000 remote administration tools
31337	Unofficial				ncat, a netcat alternative
31416	Unofficial				BOINC RPC
31438	Unofficial				Rocket U2
31457	Yes				TetriNET
32137	Unofficial				Immunet Protect (UDP in version 2.0, TCP since version 3.0)
32400	Yes				Plex Media Server
32749	Unofficial				Gridcoin
32764	Unofficial				A backdoor found on certain Linksys, Netgear and other wireless DSL modems/combination routers
32887		Unofficial			Ace of Spades, a multiplayer FPS video game
32976	Unofficial				LogMeIn Hamachi, a VPN application; also TCP port 12975 and SSL (TCP 443).
33434	Yes				traceroute
33848		Unofficial			Jenkins, a continuous integration (CI) tool
34000		Unofficial			Infestation: Survivor Stories (formerly known as The War Z), a multiplayer zombie video game
34197	No	Unofficial			Factorio, a multiplayer survival and factory-building game
35357	Yes				OpenStack Identity (Keystone) administration
36330	Unofficial				Folding@home Control Port
37008		Unofficial			TZSP intrusion detection
38412			Yes		NG Application Protocol (NGAP) for communication between a gNB and AMF in 5G core networks
40000	Yes				SafetyNET p – a real-time Industrial Ethernet protocol
41121	Yes	Reserved			Tentacle Server – Pandora FMS
41230	Assigned	Yes			Z-Wave Protocol over DTLS
41794	Yes				Crestron Control Port – Crestron Electronics
41795	Yes				Crestron Terminal Port – Crestron Electronics
41796	Yes	No			Crestron Secure Control Port – Crestron Electronics
41797	Yes	No			Crestron Secure Terminal Port – Crestron Electronics
42081–42090	Yes				Zippin –Zippin Store
42420	Unofficial				Vintage Story multiplayer server
42590–42595	Yes				Glue – MakePro X
42999	Yes				Curiosity
43110	Unofficial				ZeroNet web UI default port
43594–43595	Unofficial				RuneScape
44123	Assigned	Unofficial			Z-Wave Secure Tunnel
44405	Unofficial				Mu Online Connect Server
44818	Yes				EtherNet/IP explicit messaging
47808–47823	Yes				BACnet Building Automation and Control Networks (47808_{10} = BAC0_{16} to 47823_{10} = BACF_{16})
48556	Yes				drive.web AC/DC Drive Automation and Control Networks
48656	Unofficial				Brainy LAB Control Server
48657		Unofficial			Brainy LAB Control Server
49151	Reserved				"IANA Reserved"

== Dynamic, private or ephemeral ports ==
The range 49152–65535 (2^{15} + 2^{14} to 2^{16} − 1), 16 384 ports, contains dynamic or private ports that cannot be registered with IANA. This range is used for private or customized services, for temporary purposes, and for automatic allocation of ephemeral ports.

Dynamic, private or ephemeral ports
Port	TCP	UDP	SCTP	DCCP	Description
49152–65535	Unofficial	No			Certificate Management over CMS and Xsan Filesystem Access
49160	Unofficial				Palo Alto Networks' Panorama
50160	Unofficial				S-CONNECT protocol – data exchange (TCP) and manual device pairing (UDP)
50161		Unofficial			S-CONNECT protocol – automatic device pairing
51413	Unofficial				Transmission (BitTorrent client)
51515	Unofficial				Kopia server
51820	No	Unofficial			WireGuard protocol
52380	No	Unofficial			Sony VISCA Network Setting Protocol
52381	No	Unofficial			Sony VISCA over IP Protocol
53317	Unofficial				LocalSend
59100	Unofficial				AudioRelay
60000–61000	No	Unofficial			Range from which Mosh – a remote-terminal application similar to SSH – typically assigns ports for ongoing sessions between Mosh servers and Mosh clients
61616	Unofficial				ActiveMQ Classic
61616–61631		compressible			Ports with efficient compression in 6LoWPAN header compression
62078	Unofficial				Apple's lockdownd protocol – used for communicating with iPhones and iPads
64738	Unofficial				Mumble

== See also ==
- Comparison of file transfer protocols
- Internet protocol suite
- Port (computer networking)
- List of IP protocol numbers
- Lists of network protocols

== References and notes ==
- Stretch, Jeremy. "Common Ports" (PDF). PacketLife.net. Archived (PDF) from the original on 2018-03-28.
