= PIMS =

PIMS may refer to:

== Organizations ==
- Pacific Institute for the Mathematical Sciences
- Pakistan Institute of Medical Sciences
- Pittsburgh Institute of Mortuary Science
- Pontifical Institute of Mediaeval Studies
- Pondicherry Institute of Medical Sciences
- Pravara Institute of Medical Sciences

== Computing ==
- Parliamentary Information Management System
- Partnership for Peace Information Management System
- Profit impact of marketing strategy
- Plant Information Management System

== Other uses ==
- Paediatric inflammatory multisystem syndrome, an illness associated with COVID-19
- PiM's, a biscuit-like cake produced by LU
- Pipeline Integrity Management Strategy, an engineering methodology to ensure integrity of pipelines, see Integrity engineering
- Plasma Instrument for Magnetic Sounding, a plasma instrument on NASA's Europa Clipper

== See also ==
- PImMS, a Pixel Imaging Mass Spectrometry camera
- PMIS, abbreviation for project management information system
- Pimm's, an alcoholic beverage
- PIM (disambiguation)
