= VISCA =

VISCA may refer to:

- Visayas State University
- VISCA (protocol)
