= MSP =

MSP often refers to:

- Minneapolis–Saint Paul, the twin cities of Minneapolis and St. Paul and the surrounding area — the most populated area in Minnesota, U.S.
  - Minneapolis–Saint Paul International Airport, in Hennepin County, Minnesota, U.S. (IATA airport code and common name MSP)
  - Saint Paul Union Depot, in Saint Paul, Minnesota, U.S. (Amtrak station code MSP)

MSP may also refer to:

== Businesses and organizations ==
- LoanSphere MSP, a mortgage servicing platform application provided by Black Knight Financial Services
- Managed service provider, a third-party company that remotely manages a customer's IT infrastructure and end-user systems
- Matchstick Productions, a company producing videos of extreme sports, especially skiing
- Mathematical Sciences Publishers, a scientific publisher based in Berkeley, California
- Men's Studies Press, an academic publisher registered in Harriman, Tennessee
- Moscow Finnish School (Finnish: Moskovan suomalainen peruskoulu, MSP), a Finnish-education private school in Moscow, Russia
- Movimento Sviluppo e Pace, an Italian NGO
- MSP Estúdios, a Portuguese company that publishes comics
- Multi-Sided Platform, an organization that enables interaction between two or more groups of agents, for example through a two-sided market

== Government and politics ==
=== Police forces ===
- Malabar Special Police, a paramilitary unit of the State Police of Kerala, India
- Maine State Police, state police agency for the U.S. state of Maine
- Maryland State Police, state police agency for the U.S. state of Maryland
- Massachusetts State Police, state police agency for the U.S. state of Massachusetts
- Michigan State Police, state police agency for the U.S. state of Michigan
- Minnesota State Patrol, state police agency for the U.S. state of Minnesota

=== Political parties ===
- Movement of Society for Peace (French: Mouvement de la société pour la paix, Arabic: Harakat Moudjtamaa As-Silm حركة مجتمع السلم, formerly called Hamas حماس), an Algerian political party
- National Salvation Party (Milli Selamet Partisi), Islamist political party in Turkey
- Social Patriot Movement (Spanish: Movimiento Social Patriota), Chilean fascist organization.

=== Prisons ===
- Maine State Prison, a former prison in Thomaston, Maine
- Michigan State Prison, a former prison in Jackson, Michigan
- Mississippi State Penitentiary, in Parchman, Mississippi
- Missouri State Penitentiary, a former prison in Jefferson City, Missouri
- Montana State Prison, in Deer Lodge, Montana

=== Other uses in government and politics ===
- Main-Spessart, code used on German vehicle registration plates
- Minerals Security Partnership, a transnational association to secure a stable supply of raw materials
- Medical Services Plan of British Columbia, government-administered single-payer health insurance scheme in the Canadian province of British Columbia
- Medicare Savings Program
- Member of the Scottish Parliament
- Ministerio de Salud Pública, Uruguayan ministry of public health

== Train stations ==
- Marina South Pier MRT station, a MRT station in Singapore (MRT station abbreviation MSP)
- Midway station (Minnesota), a former train station in St. Paul, Minnesota, United States

== Science and technology ==
=== Biology, ecology, and medicine ===
- Macrophage-stimulating protein, a protein that in humans is encoded by the MST1 gene
- Major sperm protein, the most abundant protein in nematode sperm
- Marine spatial planning, a process of making decisions about sustainable use of marine resources
- Merozoite surface protein, used in malaria research
- Methylation-specific PCR, a method for detecting methylated DNA sequence
- Multiple sex partners, engaging in sexual activities with two or more people

=== Computing and information technology ===
- Max/MSP, max signal processing
- Message Send Protocol, an application-layer computing protocol used to send a short message between networking nodes on a computer network
- Message Submission Program or smmsp in Sendmail e-mail systems
- Microsoft Installer Patch Files, files downloaded from updating applications installed with Microsoft Installer and which have the .msp file extension
- Microsoft Points, the currency used on the Xbox Live and Zune marketplaces
- Microsoft Project, a project-management software program developed and sold by Microsoft
- Microsoft Student Partners, an organization of university students interested in careers in technology and showing a willingness to help others learn about Microsoft technology
- Microsoft Surface Pro
- Minimum spanning tree, a graph theory problem
- MSP (file format), a pre-bmp picture format readable in the oldest versions of Microsoft Paint
- TI MSP430, a mixed-signal microcontroller family from Texas Instruments

=== Other uses in science and technology ===
- Mechanically separated poultry, a paste-like meat product
- Micro-spectrophotometer, an instrument used to measure the UV, visible, and near-infrared spectra of microscopic objects
- Millisecond pulsar, in astronomy, a pulsar with a rotational period in the range of 1-10 milliseconds
- Mineral separation plant, a processing plant for heavy minerals
- Monosodium phosphate, a chemical compound of sodium with a phosphate counterion
- MSP Groza silent pistol, a double-barreled firearm designed in the Soviet Union in 1972

== Other uses ==
- Manic Street Preachers, Welsh rock band formed in 1986
- Meadowbrook State Parkway, in New York
- Minimum Support Price, regulated agriculture commodity price in India
- Maastricht Science Programme, Liberal Arts & Sciences programme at Maastricht University
- MovieStarPlanet, online video game
