= LDM =

LDM, Ldm or LdM may stand for:

== Businesses and organisations ==
- Laguna del Maule (LdM), is a lake located in the Andes of Central Chile
- Lorenzo de' Medici School (LdM), a private institution of higher education located in Florence, Italy
- Liberal Democrats (UK), a British political party

== Computing ==
- Logical data model, a representation of an organization's data, organized in terms of entities and relationships
- Logical Disk Manager
- Local Data Manager
- LTSP Display Manager, an X display manager for Linux Terminal Server Project
- Latent diffusion model, in machine learning

== Science ==
- Latitude dependent mantle, a widespread layer of ice-rich material on Mars
- Liquid-drop model of the atomic nucleus

== Sport ==
- Left defensive midfielder, a position in association football
- Lucas Dumbrell Motorsport

== Other uses ==
- Unit for loading meter, average height in a truck
