= Mapping of Airline Traffic over Internet Protocol =

Mapping of Airline Traffic over Internet Protocol (MATIP) is a communication protocol defined by RFC 2351. It uses the well-known ports 350 and 351. It has been created for use by computer applications to carry airline reservation, ticketing, and messaging traffic.

MATIP is preferred over classic Airline Traffic lines because:

- it allows to use low-cost tcp/ip global networks instead airline-specific networks
- it will decrease the number of communications sessions to manage
- current airline booking terminals and programs can be used with MATIP without the need of replacement
