= ARPA Host Name Server Protocol =

Obsolete hostname lookup protocol

The ARPA Host Name Server Protocol (NAMESERVER) is an obsolete network protocol used in translating a host name to an Internet address. IANA Transmission Control Protocol (TCP) and User Datagram Protocol (UDP) port 42 for NAMESERVER; this port is more commonly used by the Windows Internet Name Service (WINS) on Microsoft operating systems.

== Application ==
The NAMESERVER protocol is used by the DARPA Trivial Name Server, a server process called tnamed that is provided in some implementations of UNIX.

== Replacement ==
Support for the NAMESERVER protocol has been deprecated, and may not be available in the latest implementations of all UNIX operating systems. The Domain Name System (DNS) has replaced the ARPA Host Name Server Protocol and the DARPA Trivial Name Server.

== See also ==
- List of TCP and UDP port numbers
- List of Unix operating systems
