= Plant Information Management System =

A Plant Information Management System (PIMS) collects and integrates information about a production process from different sources.

== Overview ==
=== Tasks ===
Important tasks of a PIMS are:

- Company-wide gather, consolidate and process data
- Analysis of production performance, product quality, process capacity and control compliance.
- Provide Key Performance Indicator (KPI) to improve decision-making processes
- Reporting for decision support and documentation
- Consolidation of data from different sources (Enterprise Resource Planning (ERP), Laboratory, Distributed Control System (DCS)...)
- Integration of off-line data (laboratory, calculations, future load profiles)
- Access via the company-wide intranet also from offices. Via Web (Thin client) or Tcp / Ip (Fat client)
- Enriching / refining raw data
- Event-driven calculations
- Long-term archiving of data and reports (over many years)

=== Manufacturers ===
Manufacturers are:

- Aspen Tech InfoPlus.21 (IP.21)
- Elipse Software EPM - Elipse Plant Manager
- GE Proficy Historian
- Open Systems International Inc. CHRONUS™
- Osisoft PI
- Honeywell PHD
- Wonderware Historian
- Iba-ag Davis

== Subdivisions ==
There are the following subdivisions:

- SQL / desktop systems
- SCADA Historian
- Enterprise Historian

== See also ==
- Data acquisition
- Data collection system
- Totally integrated automation
