= Service Assurance Agent =

Active computer network measurement technology

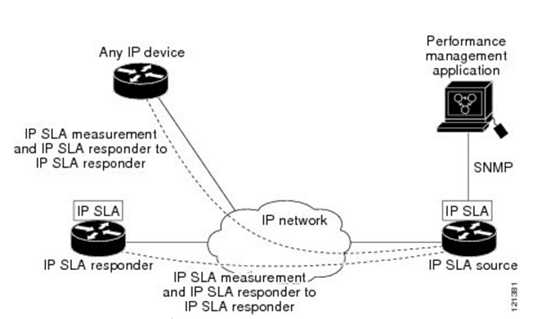
IP-SLA operation

IP SLA (Internet Protocol Service Level Agreement) is an active computer network measurement technology that was initially developed by Cisco Systems. IP SLA was previously known as Service Assurance Agent (SAA) or Response Time Reporter (RTR). IP SLA is used to track network performance like latency, ping response, and jitter, it also helps to provide service quality.

== Functions ==
Routers and switches enabled with IP SLA perform periodic network tests or measurements such as

- Hypertext Transfer Protocol (HTTP) GET
- File Transfer Protocol (FTP) downloads
- Domain Name System (DNS) lookups
- User Datagram Protocol (UDP) echo, for VoIP jitter and mean opinion score (MOS)
- Data-Link Switching (DLSw) (Systems Network Architecture (SNA) tunneling protocol)
- Dynamic Host Configuration Protocol (DHCP) lease requests
- Transmission Control Protocol (TCP) connect
- Internet Control Message Protocol (ICMP) echo (remote ping)

The exact number and types of available measurements depends on the IOS version. IP SLA is very widely used in service provider networks to generate time-based performance data. It is also used together with Simple Network Management Protocol (SNMP) and NetFlow, which generate volume-based data.

== Usage considerations ==
- For IP SLA tests, devices with IP SLA support are required. IP SLA is supported on Cisco routers and switches since IOS version 12.1. Other vendors like Juniper Networks or Enterasys Networks support IP SLA on some of their devices.
- IP SLA tests and data collection can be configured either via a console (command-line interface) or via SNMP.
- When using SNMP, both read and write community strings are needed.
- The IP SLA voice quality feature was added starting with IOS version 12.3(4)T. All versions after this, including 12.4 mainline, contain the MOS and ICPIF voice quality calculation for the UDP jitter measurement.
