= Multicast Address Dynamic Client Allocation Protocol =

The Multicast Address Dynamic Client Allocation Protocol (MADCAP) is a communication protocol that allows hosts to request multicast addresses from a server.

== Overview ==
The Multicast Address Dynamic Client Allocation Protocol (MADCAP) is designed to allow for automatic dynamic assignment of multicast addresses.

MADCAP allows for efficient allocation of multicast addresses. This is important for IPv4 which has a small number of multicast addresses available. This is less of a concern with IPv6 multicast. Whereas IPv6 allows for 2^{112} possible multicast addresses, IPv4 multicast addresses are restricted to only class D Internet addresses (224.0.0.0/4).

Port number 2535 is assigned by IANA for use with this protocol. All protocol messages are encapsulated in UDP datagrams. The MADCAP protocol has much in common with DHCP, but they are separate protocols with no common dependencies.

== History ==
MADCAP was originally based on DHCP. Microsoft included MADCAP as part of the DHCP service in Windows 2000. RFC 2730 was published as a proposed networking standard by the IETF in December 1999. Guidelines for the allocation of IPv6 multicast addresses using MADCAP were published in RFC 3307 in August 2002.
