= WhiskerControl =

Research control system

Whisker Control

- WhiskerServer running on Microsoft Windows
- Developers: Rudolf Cardinal, Mike Aitken, Cambridge Enterprise Ltd
- Initial release: 2000
- Written in: C++
- Operating system: Microsoft Windows
- Available in: English
- Type: Research control
- License: Proprietary with source available to users
- Website: www.whiskercontrol.com

Whisker is a research control system developed within the University of Cambridge, UK, and marketed by Campden Instruments Ltd (UK) and the Lafayette Instrument Company (USA). It is implemented as a server that controls a range of physical devices (including digital switches for input and output devices such as levers and pellet dispensers, multiple monitors, sound cards, and touchscreens). The server communicates with clients via a TCP/IP network link and manages resources for them. Typically, individual clients are programs that implement tasks used in behavioural research (e.g. psychology and neuroscience), such as tasks involving operant chambers.
