= Peer Distributed Transfer Protocol =

File transfer protocol

The Peer Distributed Transfer Protocol is an Internet file transfer protocol for distributing files from a central server across a peer-to-peer network. It is conceptually similar to BitTorrent but allows for streaming media. The protocol has been assigned port 6086 by the Internet Assigned Numbers Authority. The primary implementation is DistribuStream.
