= Xdebug =

PHP extension used for debugging and profiling

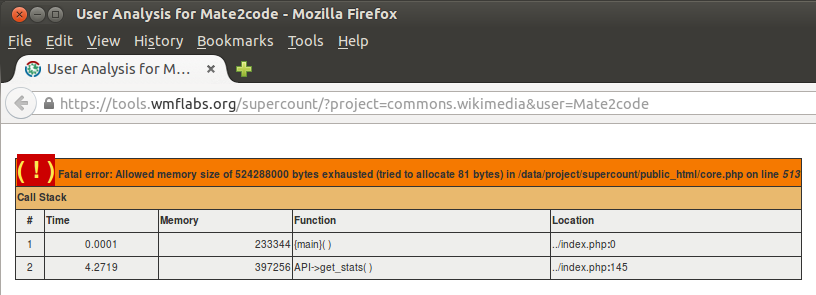
- An Xdebug error message on Wikimedia Commons
- Developer: Derick Rethans
- Initial release: May 8, 2002
- Stable release: 3.2.1 / March 21, 2023; 2 years ago
- Repository: github.com/xdebug/xdebug
- Written in: C
- Available in: English
- Type: Debugger
- License: Permissive license, derived from the MIT license
- Website: xdebug.org

UML component diagram for Xdebug and PHP, integrated via the browser and an IDE

Xdebug is a PHP extension which provides debugging and profiling capabilities. It uses the DBGp debugging protocol.

The debug information that Xdebug can provide includes the following:

- stack and function traces in error messages with:

- full parameter display for user defined functions
- function name, file name and line indications
- support for member functions

- memory allocation
- protection for infinite recursions

Xdebug also provides:

- profiling information for PHP scripts
- code coverage analysis
- capabilities to debug your scripts interactively with a debugger front-end.

Xdebug is also available via the PECL.

== See also ==
- Debugger
- Dynamic program analysis
- Software performance analysis
- Optimization
- DBG (another open source PHP debugger)
- Zend Studio (the Zend Debugger is an alternative to Xdebug)
