= Parliamentary Information Management System =

Parliamentary Information Management Services (PIMS) is an electronic library used in the Parliament of the United Kingdom.

The aims of the PIMS project were to provide easy access to parliamentary information for all users of the parliamentary intranet, by creating a new infrastructure for the storage, search, retrieval and management of parliamentary information held in the Libraries of the Houses of Commons and Lords. This would replace and extend the POLIS databases that had been used by the two Libraries for over twenty years, and provide a platform on which the services available to Members of both Houses of Parliament and the public might be developed further.

The first services went live in December 2004 supporting Commons Library enquiry handling. The main services came on stream in April 2005 with facilities for search and retrieval of material and content management. There were some initial difficulties with maintaining the currency of information in the system, and a programme of technical changes designed to improve performance was put in place and completed in November 2005. Further enhancements were made over the next few months before the project concluded in early 2006.
