= Identity Registration Protocol =

The Internet Assigned Numbers Authority (IANA) officially assigned TCP port 4604 to the Identity Registration Protocol (IRP) created by Sixscape Communications, Pte. Ltd. The assignment was issued by IANA on 17 March 2014, and is listed in the official IANA resource registry.

There are a very limited number of port numbers, which are assigned by IANA for protocols recognized as viable, complying with current protocol design standards, and not already covered by existing Internet standards. For example, port 25 was assigned to the SMTP email protocol many years ago. This establishes a standard and eliminates conflicts with other protocols. The technical review of IRP was performed by Lars Eggert, the distinguished chair of the Internet Research Task Force.

IRP was created by Lawrence E. Hughes, co-founder and CTO of Sixscape Communications, to allow applications to register their name, email address, UserID, their current IPv6 address and other information with the company's Domain Identity Registry server. IRP also supports all functions of a Public Key Infrastructure and an authenticated Address Registry. Sixscape's Domain Identity Registry server issues and manages X.509 client digital certificates for authentication and secure messaging. The Address Registry feature enables a new connectivity paradigm, called End2End Direct, in which user applications can connect directly to each other rather than via intermediary servers as is common with Client/Server architecture applications common on the older IPv4 Internet.

IRP is a streaming network protocol (TCP-based, connection-oriented). It is a Client/Server design with clearly defined server and client roles and implementations. It is secured with TLS v1.2 using the latest, strongest ciphersuites (e.g. Diffie Hellman Ephemeral for key exchange, AES256 for symmetric encryption and SHA2/384 for message digest). It does server to client authentication using an X.509 Server certificate, similar to web or email servers. It normally does client to server authentication with X.509 client certificates (usually obtained via IRP), with fallback to Username/Password Authentication (UPA) if needed. UPA can be disabled on a per-user basis. IRP protocol messages are valid XML documents.

== See also ==
- List of TCP and UDP port numbers
