= CRUSE =

Company in Germany

Cruse scanner in operation

CRUSE Spezialmaschinen GmbH is a German manufacturer of scanning devices, based in Wachtberg, North Rhine-Westphalia.

The firm produces high-end scanners, most of which are sold to government institutions, museums and archives such as the Smithsonian, the Guggenheim, the V&A Museum and the Vatican Secret Archive. Their scanners are large and specialised, and capable of scanning large pieces of artworks in one go. The machines create digital images without physically contacting the artworks. A company in Michigan, the United States has used the scanners for works of fine art up to 60- by 72-inches. With a fixed light source and scan head, and a moving vacuum table, the scanners provide even illumination over the whole surface of the original copies, while exposing the copies to very little light.

A study published in IS&T (digital) Archiving Conference in 2012 investigated the color accuracy of five camera systems used for museum image-archiving applications: Phase One IQ 180, Leaf Aptus 75, Hasselblad H4D-50, Cruse scanner, and a Sinar 75H modified to incorporate the RIT Dual-RGB approach. A Betterlight Super 8K was also used in the test as a benchmark. The study found that only the Sinar and the Cruse systems were optimized for archival imaging, and their results were acceptable. The Hasselblad and the Phase One systems needed significant visual editing to make archival color images.
