= Message Send Protocol =

The Message Send Protocol (MSP) is an application layer protocol used to send a short message between nodes on a network. The original version of the protocol was published in 1990. It was updated as Message Send Protocol 2 in 1992.

== TCP-based service ==
One message send service is defined as a connection-based application on TCP. A service listens for TCP connections on port 18. Once a connection is established, a short message is transmitted from the sender to the receiver over the connection. The sender closes the connection after sending the message.

== UDP-based service ==
Another message send service is defined as a datagram-based application on UDP. A service listens for UDP datagrams on port 18. When a datagram is received by the receiver, an answering datagram is sent back to the sender containing exactly the same data.

== See also ==
- LAN Messenger
- List of TCP and UDP port numbers
- SMTP
