= Softbench =

Plug-in Integrated Development Environment (IDE)

HP Softbench was one of the first plug-in Integrated Development Environment (IDE) tool based on the UNIX operating system, UNIX tools and the X Window System.

The main ideas were:

- Tools and data can reside on many different systems across the network
- Tool communication using a Broadcast Message Server
- Common user interface
- Integrated help facility
- Tool Slots
- Encapsulator: tool for encapsulate any CASE tool into a Tool Slot if it supports standard I/O.

== History ==
SoftBench was released in 1989 and presented in the June 1990 HP Journal. It was an early adoption of some of the IDE ideas that are common today in well known IDEs like Eclipse.
