= Minger Email Address Verification Protocol =

Internet Engineering Task Force draft

Minger Email Address Verification Protocol is an Internet Engineering Task Force draft for lightweight verification of an e-mail address between trusted servers. It was created by Arvel Hathcock and Jonathan Merkel as a practical alternative to the Finger protocol or SMTP call-forward. The MDaemon e-mail server uses Minger to realize domain sharing over multiple servers with distributed mailboxes.

IANA has reserved and assigned TCP and UDP port 4069 to Minger protocol.

On February 3, 2010, draft 6 expired. On March 9, 2016, draft 7 was released, but it is available only within MDaemon's documentation.
