= Network Caller ID =

- Developer: John L. Chmielewski
- Stable release: 1.18 / May 10, 2025
- Written in: C, Perl, Tcl, Unix Shell
- Operating system: Cross-platform
- Type: Plain Old Telephone Service (POTS) and Voice over Internet Protocol
- License: GNU General Public License
- Website: https://ncid.sourceforge.net/

Network Caller ID (NCID) is an open-source client/server network Caller ID (CID) package.

NCID consists of a server called ncidd (short for NCID daemon), a universal client called ncid, and multiple client output modules and gateways. The server, ncidd, monitors either a modem, device or gateway for the CID data. The data is collected and sent, via TCP, to one or more connected clients.

Many devices, including smartphones, and services can detect caller ID information. An NCID gateway collects CID data from these other sources and passes it on to the main NCID server. From there the CID data is distributed to all connected clients, just like CID data collected from a traditional modem. One example of a non-modem device is a VoIP (Voice over IP) service that collects CID data as SIP packets. Another example is the Whozz Calling series of Ethernet Link devices that obtain CID information from multiple POTS (Plain old telephone service) lines.

NCID supports messages. Clients can send a one line message to all connected clients.

The client can also be used to push CID to other computers and devices with output modules.

Various clients are available on numerous platforms, including Android, iOS, Linux, macOS and Windows.

== Protocol ==
The NCID protocol is simple, human-readable ASCII text consisting of field pairs—a field label and its field data—using the asterisk character as a delimiter. Transmission between the NCID server and its clients is done via TCP/IP, usually over port 3333. Additional field pairs have been added as the NCID server has been enhanced with new features and support for more devices. Here is an example of the minimum of caller ID data.

CID:*DATE*09182012*TIME*1320*LINE*POTS*NMBR*4075551212*NAME*John on cell*

== List of input sources ==
Hardware that can supply caller ID data to the NCID server, either by the NCID server accessing the device directly (RS232 serial port or USB) or indirectly via NCID Gateways (scripts and programs included with the NCID package).

=== Modems ===
AT-compatible modems expect Telcos to send caller ID data as either Single Data Message Format (SDMF) or Multiple Data Message Format (MDMF). The modem then decodes the data stream into human readable text, which the NCID Server then parses. If a modem supports it, the NCID Server can also decode the raw SDMF or MDMF data stream.

Manufacturer	Model	Status	NCID Features Supported (Note A)	Type	Country Tested	Country Code (AT+GCI?)	Chipset Manufacturer (AT+FMI)	Chipset Query Result (ATI3)	Chipset Firmware Patch Version (AT-PV)	Vend:Prod ID (if USB or PCI)	Notes	Owner(s)
3Com Corp (U.S. Robotics)	3CP2976 (US)	Partial	CID, VOICE	PCI	US	ERROR	U.S. Robotics 56K Voice	U.S. Robotics 56K Voice INT V5.20.1		12b9:1008	Use AT#CID=1. See also Note D.	
Apple	Jump	Working	CID, FAX	Internal	US	B5	ERROR	Motorola SM56 1.3.9	ERROR		ATI4 gives "Apple Internal Modem"	taa
Apple	MA034Z/A	Broken		USB	US	B5	ERROR	Motorola SM56 USB 1.5.10	ERROR	05ac:1401	ATI4 gives "Apple USB Modem". See also Note H.	taa
Dell	RD02-D400	Broken	RING	USB	US	??	ERROR	CX93001-EIS_V0.2002-V92	F10574	0572:1324	Reported broken here. See also Note G.	
Dualcomm	USB Adapter/Modem for Caller ID Display (old model)	Working	CID, FAX, VOICE	USB	US	B5	Conexant (Rockwell)	CX93001-EIS_V0.2002-V92	F1053 and F10539	0572:1329		taa
Dualcomm	DCID-300 (newer model) buy	Untested		USB								
Hiro	HiRO H50113 V92 56K External USB Data Fax Dial Up Internet Modem don't buy	Broken	??	USB	US	??	??	??	??	??	Not recognized by Linux	Ed
LB-LINK	BL-UM03B buy	Working	CID, FAX, VOICE	USB	US	B5	Conexant Systems (Rockwell), Inc	CX93001-EIS_V0.2013-V92		0572:1340		
MultiTech Systems	MT5656ZDX-V	Working	CID, VOICE, FAX	Serial, external	US	B5	ERROR	ACF3_V2.000E-V90_P21_FSH				
Phoebe	CMV1456VQE FAX modem	Working	CID, FAX	Serial, External	US only	??	??	??	??			
Rosewill	RNX-56USB	Working	CID, VOICE	USB	US	B5	Conexant Systems (Rockwell)	CX93001-EIS_V0.2002-V92		0572:1321	Some reports of no CID	
Sewell	SW-29644	Working	CID, FAX, VOICE	USB	Italy	B5	Conexant Systems (Rockwell)	CX93001-EIS_V0.2013-V92		0572:1340	Working FAX and VOICE with AT+VCID=1	eikaff
Sewell	SW-29644 buy	Working	CID, FAX, VOICE	USB	Canada	B5/20	Conexant	CX93001-EIS_V0.2013-V92	0000000000	0572:1340	Tested CID and VOICE hangup with AT+VCID=1	Ed
StarTech	USB562KEMH	Working	CID, FAX, VOICE	USB	US	B5	Conexant Systems (Rockwell)	CX93001-EIS_V0.2002-V92	F10539	0572:1329	See Note F	Ed
TrendNet	TFM-561U	Working	CID, FAX, VOICE	USB	US	B5	Conexant Systems (Rockwell)	CX93001-EIS_V0.2002-V92	F1054D	0572:1329	See Note E	
TRIXES	TRIXES buy	Broken	RING	USB	UK	B4	Conexant	CX93001-EIS_V0.2002-V92		0572:1329	Reports RING, sometimes Caller ID. See also Note B.	
U.S. Robotics	5637 (UK) buy	Partial	CID, VOICE	USB	UK	??	??	U.S. Robotics 56K FAX USB V1.2.23		0baf:0303??	Use AT#CID=1. See also Note C.	
U.S. Robotics	5637 (US)	Partial	CID, VOICE	USB	US	??	??	U.S. Robotics 56K FAX USB V1.2.23		0baf:0303	Use AT#CID=1. See also Note C.	
U.S. Robotics	5686E	Working	CID, FAX	serial	US	ERROR	Conexant	CX93010?			Use AT#CID=1. Reported working here	
Zoom	3090 (US)	Broken	?	USB	US	?	?	?	?	0803:3090	Windows only, softmodem	
Zoom	3095 (UK)	Working	CID, FAX, VOICE	USB	UK	B4	Conexant	CX93001-EIS_V0.2002-V92	F105C7	0803:3095	Use AT+VCID=1. See also Note B.	
Zoom	3095 (US) buy	Working	CID, FAX, VOICE	USB	US	B5	Conexant	CX93001-EIS_V0.2002-V92	F10572	0803:3095	See also Note B.	

- Note A: RING means ring only, no Caller ID, no hangup. CID means Caller ID and simple hangup. FAX and VOICE mean their respective hangup options. Unless otherwise noted, the presence of VOICE indicates the modem will use the default NumberDisconnected.rmd (raw modem file) distributed with NCID.
- Note B(1): Zoom and TRIXES. Prior to NCID version 0.89, FAX hangup was not a configurable option, and two blog/forum posts (here and here) have patches to add FAX hangup. Starting with NCID version 0.89, FAX hangup is now a configurable option so the patches are no longer necessary. The NCID developers have been unable to contact the author at Murphy 101 Blog to have the blog updated.
- Note B(2): Zoom 3095 USB modems appear to be particularly sensitive to power levels. A common reported symptom is having to unplug and re-plug the modem into the USB port to get it to work. A more detailed discussion can be found here.
- Note C: US Robotics 5637. Tested with Fedora, Raspberry Pi and Ubuntu. Connected to the UK British Telecom and US caller id systems. FAX hangup will not hangup the line, will disconnect the modem and will abort ncidd. Several users report problems using this modem with the Raspberry Pi in particular.
- Note D: 3Com 3CP2976. Linux utility lspci reports "04:01.0 Serial controller: 3Com Corp, Modem Division 56K FaxModem Model 5610 (rev 01)".
- Note E: Works on several Linux distros. Confirmed to work on Raspberry Pi 3 running Ubuntu Mate and Pi 3-B Raspbian Jessie—but does not work if the Raspberry power supply can't do 2 amps
- Note F: Works on several Linux distros. Curiously, StarTech says it has a Conexant CX93010 chip, but the one tested responds with CX93001.
- Note G: CallerID intentionally disabled by vendor in EEPROM patch. CallerID can be reenabled in any CX93001-based modem via simple RAM patch after ATZ command: AT!4886=00 for Bell FSK countries, AT!4886=01 for V23 FSK (Japan), AT!4886=02 for ETSI FSK (France, Italy, Spain), AT!4886=03 for SIN227 (UK), AT!4886=05 for ETSI DTMF. Sometimes additionally AT!4892=FF may be required.
- Note H: This modem was released October 12, 2005 and discontinued in September 2009. It does not work on any modern version of macOS or Linux.

=== NIETO ===
- Thomas Glembocki's entry won Honorable Mention in the 2007 Circuit Cellar Wiznet Ethernet design contest for his project NIETO: An NCID and NTP Client

== Consumer network routers with embedded NCID Server ==
Manufacturer	Model	Supported NCID server version according to Manufacturer
Zyxel or Telekom	Speedlink 5501	0.74 page 13
AVM Vodafone	Easybox 602 screenshot on page 146	?
AVM Vodafone	Easybox 802 screenshot	?
AVM Vodafone	Easybox 803 screenshot	?
AVM Vodafone	Easybox 904 screenshot	?
AVM Vodafone	Fritz!box	?
