= Systat (protocol) =

Systat or Active Users is a simple Internet protocol ostensibly useful for "debugging and measurement". A connection to port 11, by either TCP or UDP, elicits a list of users currently logged into the system. Though it remains an official Internet protocol, its use is considered a security vulnerability.
