= VISCA (protocol) =

Camera control protocol

VISCA is a professional camera control protocol used with PTZ cameras. It was designed by Sony to be used on several of its surveillance and OEM block cameras.

== Implementation ==
It is based on RS-232 serial communications at 9600 bit/s, 8N1, no flow control typically though a DE-9 connector, but can also be on 8-Pin DIN, RJ45 and RJ11 connectors used in daisy chain configurations.

VISCA utilizes a serial repeater network configuration to communicate between the PC (device #0) and up to 7 peripherals (#1 through #7). The daisy chain cable configuration means that a message walks the chain until it reaches the target device identified in the data packet. Responses then walk the rest of the way down the chain and back up again to reach the system. Some packets may be broadcast to all devices.

A command data packet consists:

- Address byte (1) message header
- Information bytes (1..14)
- Terminating byte (1) 0xFF

The message header is of the format:

bit 7: always ‘1’
bits 6-4: source device#
bit 3: ‘0’ normal packet/ ‘1’ for broadcast packets
bits 2-0: destination device# or ‘000’ for broadcast
In the packet descriptions below, multi-byte quantities are big-endian (Motorola-style) ordering, with the MSB at
[i] and the LSB at [i+1].

Each command data packet has a corresponding response data packet. The response to a particular packet is variable in size and may indicate an error condition.

== Uses ==
The VISCA Protocol is used on LectureSight, Avaya Scopia, Angekis, Atlona, AREC HDVS series cameras, Polycom and Cisco/Tandberg video conferencing systems. Sony and Canon use VISCA for CCTV cameras. Blackmagic Design ATEM switchers that have RS-422 port and controlled by either ATEM 1M/E or ATEM 2M/E control panels are capable of controlling VISCA protocol compatible cameras as of November 2015.
