= Elipse Software =

Brazilian industrial automation software producer

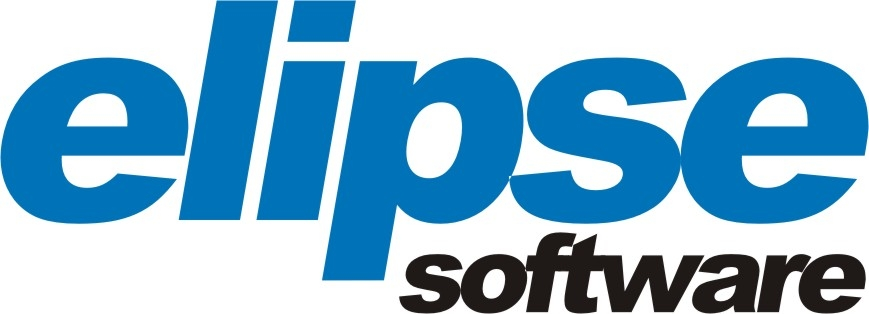
- Company type: Private
- Industry: Computer software
- Founded: September 15, 1986
- Headquarters: Porto Alegre, RS, Brazil
- Area served: Worldwide
- Key people: Ricardo Haetinger; (CEO)
- Products: Elipse E3; Elipse SCADA; Elipse Power; Elipse Plant Manager; Elipse Mobile; Elipse TrendExplorer
- Website: elipse.com.br

Elipse Software is a Brazilian industrial automation software producer whose main activities are designing and selling software for HMI/SCADA projects and interfaces for many types of applications. It was founded in 1986 in Porto Alegre, Brazil. Its four Brazilian branches are located in the cities of São Paulo, Rio de Janeiro, Curitiba and Belo Horizonte. It also has an international branch in Taiwan.

The company is headquartered in Porto Alegre (southern Brazil), providing industrial automation software for several industries, such as Energy, Infrastructure, Water and Wastewater, Food and Beverage, Mining and Metals, and Pharmaceutical and Life Sciences.

Elipse Software is a Microsoft Gold Certified Partner, and has been a member of the OPC Foundation since 1999. In 2014, it was listed in Gartner's "Cool Vendors" report for Brazil and Asia (Taiwan).

== See also ==
- SCADA
- Automation
