= Local Data Manager =

Atmospheric data distribution system

The Local Data Manager (LDM) is a suite of programs for the distribution of near real-time atmospheric earth data to researchers and educators free of charge as it becomes available. The system is specifically focused with passing, receiving, and managing arbitrary data products accessed through event-driven (push) technologies via the Internet. Data products mostly include GOES satellite imagery, radar imagery, and model output from the National Centers for Environmental Prediction, the Canadian Meteorological Centre, and the Fleet Numerical Meteorology and Oceanography Center.

LDM is provided freely, including source code by the University Corporation for Atmospheric Research under the Unidata Program Center and via the developer's GitHub. It is widely used in the meteorological community, and is a product of the Internet Data Distribution (IDD) Program which has brought together over 160 universities in the Unidata community to build a means for publicizing and accessing data from observing systems as soon as the data becomes available.
