= List of RFCs =

This is a partial list of RFCs (request for comments memoranda). A Request for Comments (RFC) is a publication in a series from the principal technical development and standards-setting bodies for the Internet, most prominently the Internet Engineering Task Force (IETF).

While there are over 9,963 RFCs as of May 2026, this list consists of RFCs that have related articles. A complete list is available from the IETF website.

== Numerical list ==
| # | Title | Date published | Related article | Made obsolete by | Notes |
|---|---|---|---|---|---|
| RFC 20 | ASCII format for Network Interchange | October 16, 1969 | ASCII | | |
| RFC 42 | Message Data Types | March 31, 1970 | | | |
| RFC 768 | User Datagram Protocol | August 28, 1980 | UDP | | |
| RFC 783 | THE TFTP PROTOCOL (REVISION 2) | June 1981 | TFTP | RFC 1350 | |
| RFC 791 | Internet Protocol | September 1981 | IPv4 | | |
| RFC 792 | INTERNET CONTROL MESSAGE PROTOCOL | September 1981 | ICMP | | |
| RFC 793 | TRANSMISSION CONTROL PROTOCOL | September 1981 | TCP | RFC 9293 | |
| RFC 826 | An Ethernet Address Resolution Protocol | November 1982 | ARP | | |
| RFC 854 | TELNET PROTOCOL SPECIFICATION | May 1983 | Telnet | | |
| RFC 855 | TELNET OPTION SPECIFICATIONS | May 1983 | Telnet | | |
| RFC 862 | Echo Protocol | May 1983 | Echo | | |
| RFC 863 | Discard Protocol | May 1983 | DISCARD | | |
| RFC 864 | Character Generator Protocol | May 1983 | CHARGEN | | |
| RFC 868 | Time Protocol | May 1983 | TIME | | |
| RFC 903 | A Reverse Address Resolution Protocol | June 1984 | RARP | | |
| RFC 937 | POST OFFICE PROTOCOL - VERSION 2 | February 1985 | POP v 2 | | |
| RFC 951 | BOOTSTRAP PROTOCOL (BOOTP) | September 1985 | BOOTP | | |
| RFC 959 | FILE TRANSFER PROTOCOL (FTP) | October 1985 | FTP | | |
| RFC 1034 | DOMAIN NAMES - CONCEPTS AND FACILITIES | November 1987 | DNS | | |
| RFC 1035 | DOMAIN NAMES - IMPLEMENTATION AND SPECIFICATION | November 1987 | DNS | | |
| RFC 1036 | Standard for Interchange of USENET Messages | December 1987 | Usenet | | |
| RFC 1055 | A Non-Standard for Transmission of IP Datagrams Over Serial Lines: SLIP | June 1988 | SLIP | | |
| RFC 1058 | Routing Information Protocol | June 1988 | RIP v 1 | | |
| RFC 1059 | Network Time Protocol (version 1) specification and implementation | July 1988 | NTP v 1 | | |
| RFC 1087 | Ethics and the Internet | January 1989 | Internet Ethics | | |
| RFC 1118 | The Hitchhikers Guide to the Internet | September 1989 | The Hitchhikers Guide to the Internet | | |
| RFC 1119 | Network Time Protocol (version 2) specification and implementation | September 1989 | NTP v 2 | | |
| RFC 1149 | A Standard for the Transmission of IP Datagrams on Avian Carriers | April 1, 1990 | IP over Avian Carriers | | |
| RFC 1157 | A Simple Network Management Protocol (SNMP) | May 1990 | SNMP v1 | | |
| RFC 1176 | INTERACTIVE MAIL ACCESS PROTOCOL - VERSION 2 | August 1990 | IMAP v 2 | | |
| RFC 1191 | Path MTU Discovery | November 1990 | PMTUD | | Obsoletes RFC 1063 |
| RFC 1305 | Network Time Protocol (Version 3) Specification, Implementation and Analysis | March 1992 | NTP v 3 | RFC 5905 | Obsoletes RFC 1119, RFC 1059, RFC 958 |
| RFC 1321 | The MD5 Message-Digest Algorithm | April 1992 | MD5 | | |
| RFC 1350 | THE TFTP PROTOCOL (REVISION 2) | July 1992 | TFTP | | Obsoletes RFC 783 |
| RFC 1436 | The Internet Gopher Protocol | March 1993 | Gopher | | |
| RFC 1441 | Introduction to version 2 of the Internet-standard Network Management Framework | April 1993 | SNMP v 2 | | |
| RFC 1459 | Internet Relay Chat Protocol | May 1993 | IRC | | |
| RFC 1730 | INTERNET MESSAGE ACCESS PROTOCOL - VERSION 4 | December 1994 | IMAP v 4 | | |
| RFC 1777 | Lightweight Directory Access Protocol | March 1995 | LDAP | | |
| RFC 1855 | Netiquette Guidelines | October 1995 | Netiquette | | |
| RFC 1918 | Address Allocation for Private Internets | February 1996 | Private network | | |
| RFC 1928 | SOCKS Protocol Version 5 | March 1996 | SOCKS5 | | |
| RFC 1939 | Post Office Protocol - Version 3 | May 1996 | POP v 3 | | |
| RFC 1945 | Hypertext Transfer Protocol—HTTP/1.0 | May 1996 | HTTP v 1.0 | | |
| RFC 1948 | Defending Against Sequence Number Attacks | May 1996 | IP spoofing | | |
| RFC 1950 | ZLIB Compressed Data Format Specification version 3.3 | May 1996 | Zlib v 3.3 | | |
| RFC 1951 | DEFLATE Compressed Data Format Specification version 1.3 | May 1996 | DEFLATE v 1.3 | | |
| RFC 1952 | GZIP file format specification version 4.3 | May 1996 | Gzip v 4.3 | | |
| RFC 1964 | The Kerberos Version 5 GSS-API Mechanism | June 1996 | Kerberos; GSSAPI | | |
| RFC 2080 | RIPng for IPv6 | January 1997 | RIP v ng | | |
| RFC 2119 | Key words for use in RFCs to Indicate Requirement Levels | March 1997 | Request for Comments | | Updated by RFC 8174 |
| RFC 2131 | Dynamic Host Configuration Protocol | March 1997 | DHCP | | |
| RFC 2177 | IMAP4 IDLE command | June 1997 | IMAP IDLE | | |
| RFC 2195 | IMAP/POP AUTHorize Extension for Simple Challenge/Response | September 1997 | CRAM-MD5 | | |
| RFC 2228 | FTP Security Extensions | October 1997 | FTP | | |
| RFC 2230 | Key Exchange Delegation Record for the DNS | November 1997 | Secure DNS | | |
| RFC 2246 | The TLS Protocol Version 1.0 | January 1999 | TLS 1.0 | | |
| RFC 2251 | Lightweight Directory Access Protocol (v3) | December 1997 | LDAP v 3 | | |
| RFC 2252 | Lightweight Directory Access Protocol (v3): Attribute Syntax Definitions | December 1997 | LDAP v 3 | | |
| RFC 2253 | Lightweight Directory Access Protocol (v3): UTF-8 String Representation of Distinguished Names | December 1997 | LDAP v 3 | | |
| RFC 2254 | The String Representation of LDAP Search Filters | December 1997 | LDAP v 3 | | |
| RFC 2255 | The LDAP URL Format | December 1997 | LDAP v 3 | | |
| RFC 2256 | A Summary of the X.500(96) User Schema for use with LDAPv3 | December 1997 | LDAP v 3 | | |
| RFC 2326 | Real Time Streaming Protocol (RTSP) | April 1998 | RTSP | | |
| RFC 2327 | SDP: Session Description Protocol | April 1998 | SDP | | |
| RFC 2328 | OSPF Version 2 | April 1998 | OSPF | | |
| RFC 2351 | Mapping of Airline Reservation, Ticketing, and Messaging Traffic over IP | May 1998 | MATIP | | |
| RFC 2362 | Protocol Independent Multicast-Sparse Mode (PIM-SM) | June 1998 | PIM | | |
| RFC 2397 | The "data" URL scheme | August 1998 | Data: URI scheme | | |
| RFC 2407 | Internet IP Security Domain of Interpretation for ISAKMP. | November 1998 | IKE | | |
| RFC 2408 | Internet Security Association and Key Management Protocol (ISAKMP) | November 1998 | IKE | | |
| RFC 2409 | The Internet Key Exchange (IKE) | November 1998 | IKE | | |
| RFC 2427 | Multiprotocol Interconnect over Frame Relay | September 1998 | Frame Relay | 1294, 1490 | |
| RFC 2453 | RIP Version 2 | November 1998 | RIP v 2 | | |
| RFC 2460 | Internet Protocol, Version 6 (IPv6) Specification | December 1998 | IPv6 | RFC 8200 | |
| RFC 2549 | IP over Avian Carriers with Quality of Service | April 1, 1999 | IP over Avian Carriers | | |
| RFC 2555 | 30 Years of RFCs | April 7, 1999 | | | Retraces the history of RFCs |
| RFC 2570 | Introduction to Version 3 of the Internet-standard Network Management Framework | April 1999 | SNMP v3 | | |
| RFC 2595 | Using TLS with IMAP, POP3 and ACAP | June 1999 | STARTTLS for IMAP, POP3 and ACAP | | |
| RFC 2606 | Reserved Top Level DNS Names | June 1999 | Fictitious domain name | | example.com, .test, ... |
| RFC 2740 | OSPF for IPv6 | December 1999 | OSPF | | |
| RFC 2743 | Generic Security Service Application Program Interface Version 2, Update 1 | January 2000 | GSSAPI v 2 | | |
| RFC 2744 | Generic Security Service API Version 2 : C-bindings | January 2000 | GSSAPI v 2 | | |
| RFC 2801 | Internet Open Trading Protocol - IOTP Version 1.0 | April 2000 | Internet Open Trading Protocol | | |
| RFC 2802 | Digital Signatures for the v1.0 Internet Open Trading Protocol (IOTP) | April 2000 | Internet Open Trading Protocol | | |
| RFC 2810 | Internet Relay Chat: Architecture | April 2000 | IRC | | |
| RFC 2811 | Internet Relay Chat: Channel Management | April 2000 | IRC | | |
| RFC 2812 | Internet Relay Chat: Client Protocol | April 2000 | IRC | | |
| RFC 2813 | Internet Relay Chat: Server Protocol | April 2000 | IRC | | |
| RFC 2853 | Generic Security Service API Version 2 : Java Bindings | June 2000 | GSSAPI v 2 | | |
| RFC 2865 | Remote Authentication Dial In User Service (RADIUS) | June 2000 | RADIUS | | |
| RFC 2866 | RADIUS Accounting | June 2000 | RADIUS | | |
| RFC 2935 | Internet Open Trading Protocol (IOTP) HTTP Supplement | September 2000 | Internet Open Trading Protocol | | |
| RFC 2974 | Session Announcement Protocol | October 2000 | SAP | | |
| RFC 3504 | Internet Open Trading Protocol (IOTP), Version 1, Errata | March 2003 | Internet Open Trading Protocol | | |
| RFC 3022 | Traditional IP Network Address Translator (Traditional NAT) | January 2001 | NAT | | |
| RFC 3031 | Multiprotocol Label Switching Architecture | January 2001 | MPLS | | |
| RFC 3053 | IPv6 Tunnel Broker | January 2001 | Tunnel Broker | | |
| RFC 3056 | Connection of IPv6 Domains via IPv4 Clouds | February 2001 | 6to4 | | |
| RFC 3080 | The Blocks Extensible Exchange Protocol Core | March 2001 | BEEP | | |
| RFC 3162 | RADIUS and IPv6 | August 2001 | RADIUS (IPv6) | | |
| RFC 3207 | SMTP Service Extension for Secure SMTP over Transport Layer Security | February 2002 | STARTTLS for SMTP | | |
| RFC 3261 | SIP: Session Initiation Protocol | June 2002 | SIP | | |
| RFC 3284 | The VCDIFF Generic Differencing and Compression Data Format | June 2002 | VCDIFF | | |
| RFC 3286 | An Introduction to the Stream Control Transmission Protocol (SCTP) | May 2002 | SCTP | | |
| RFC 3315 | Dynamic Host Configuration Protocol for IPv6 (DHCPv6) | July 2003 | DHCP (IPv6) | | |
| RFC 3339 | Date and Time on the Internet: Timestamps | July 2002 | Timestamp | | |
| RFC 3376 | Internet Group Management Protocol, Version 3 | October 2002 | IGMP v 3 | | |
| RFC 3401 | Dynamic Delegation Discovery System (DDDS) Part One: The Comprehensive DDDS | October 2002 | DDDS | | |
| RFC 3402 | Dynamic Delegation Discovery System (DDDS) Part Two: The Algorithm | October 2002 | DDDS | | |
| RFC 3403 | Dynamic Delegation Discovery System (DDDS) Part Three: The Domain Name System (DNS) Database | October 2002 | DDDS | | |
| RFC 3404 | Dynamic Delegation Discovery System (DDDS) Part Four: The Uniform Resource Identifiers (URI) Resolution Application | October 2002 | DDDS | | |
| RFC 3405 | Dynamic Delegation Discovery System (DDDS) Part Five: URI.ARPA Assignment Procedures | October 2002 | DDDS | | |
| RFC 3492 | Punycode: A Bootstring encoding of Unicode for Internationalized Domain Names in Applications (IDNA) | March 2003 | Punycode | | |
| RFC 3501 | INTERNET MESSAGE ACCESS PROTOCOL - VERSION 4rev1 | March 2003 | IMAP v 4r1 | | |
| RFC 3530 | Network File System (NFS) version 4 Protocol | April 2003 | NFS v 4 | RFC 7530 | |
| RFC 3538 | Secure Electronic Transaction (SET) Supplement for the v1.0 Internet Open Trading Protocol (IOTP) | June 2003 | Internet Open Trading Protocol | | |
| RFC 3550 | RTP: A Transport Protocol for Real-Time Applications | July 2003 | RTP | | |
| RFC 3711 | The Secure Real-time Transport Protocol (SRTP) | March 2004 | SRTP | | |
| RFC 3720 | Internet Small Computer Systems Interface (iSCSI) | April 2004 | ISCSI | | |
| RFC 3730 | Extensible Provisioning Protocol (EPP) | March 2004 | Extensible Provisioning Protocol | | |
| RFC 3783 | Small Computer Systems Interface (SCSI) Command Ordering Considerations with iSCSI | May 2004 | ISCSI | | |
| RFC 3801 | Voice Profile for Internet Protocol | June 2004 | VPIM | | |
| RFC 3830 | MIKEY: Multimedia Internet KEYing | August 2004 | MIKEY | | |
| RFC 3867 | Payment Application Programmers Interface (API) for v1.0 | November 2004 | Internet Open Trading Protocol | | |
| RFC 3977 | Network News Transfer Protocol | October 2006 | NNTP | | |
| RFC 4121 | The Kerberos Version 5 - Generic Security Service Application Program Interface (GSS-API) | July 2005 | Kerberos | | |
| RFC 4122 | A Universally Unique IDentifier (UUID) URN Namespace | July 2005 | UUID | | |
| RFC 4151 | The 'tag' URI Scheme | October 2005 | Tag URI scheme | | |
| RFC 4213 | Basic Transition Mechanisms for IPv6 Hosts and Routers | October 2005 | 6in4 | | |
| RFC 4217 | Securing FTP with TLS | October 2005 | SSL FTP (FTPS) | | |
| RFC 4271 | Border Gateway Protocol 4 | January 2006 | Border Gateway Protocol | | |
| RFC 4287 | The Atom Syndication Format | December 2005 | Atom | | |
| RFC 4251 | The Secure Shell (SSH) Protocol Architecture | January 2006 | SSH-2 | | |
| RFC 4291 | IP Version 6 Addressing Architecture | February 2006 | IPv6 | | |
| RFC 4353 | A Framework for Conferencing with the Session Initiation Protocol (SIP) | February 2006 | Conference call | | |
| RFC 4408 | Sender Policy Framework (SPF) for Authorizing Use of Domains in E-Mail, Version 1 | January 2006 | SPF | | |
| RFC 4422 | Simple Authentication and Security Layer (SASL) | June 2006 | SASL | | |
| RFC 4541 | Considerations for Internet Group Management Protocol (IGMP) and Multicast Listener Discovery (MLD) Snooping Switches | May 2006 | IGMP snooping | | |
| RFC 4575 | A Session Initiation Protocol (SIP) Event Package for Conference State | August 2006 | Conference call | | |
| RFC 4579 | Session Initiation Protocol (SIP) Call Control - Conferencing for User Agents | August 2006 | Conference call | | |
| RFC 6234 | US Secure Hash Algorithms (SHA and HMAC-SHA) | July 2006 | SHA-1, SHA-2 | | |
| RFC 4655 | A Path Computation Element (PCE)-Based Architecture | August 2008 | Path computation element | | |
| RFC 4787 | Network Address Translation (NAT) Behavioral Requirements for Unicast UDP | January 2007 | NAT | | |
| RFC 4960 | Stream Control Transmission Protocol | September 2007 | SCTP | | |
| RFC 5023 | The Atom Publishing Protocol | October 2007 | Atom | | |
| RFC 5228 | Sieve: An Email Filtering Language | January 2008 | Sieve | | Obsoletes RFC 3028 |
| RFC 5321 | Simple Mail Transfer Protocol | October 2008 | SMTP, Internet Message Format | | |
| RFC 5322 | Internet Message Format | October 2008 | SMTP, Internet Message Format | | |
| RFC 5533 | Shim6: Level 3 Multihoming Shim Protocol for IPv6 | June 2009 | Site Multihoming by IPv6 Intermediation | | |
| RFC 5545 | iCalendar Specification | September 2009 | iCalendar | | |
| RFC 5646 | Tags for Identifying Languages | September 2009 | language tags | | |
| RFC 5849 | The OAuth 1.0 Protocol | April 2010 | OAuth | | |
| RFC 5880 | Bidirectional Forwarding Detection | June 2010 | BFD | | |
| RFC 5881 | BFD for IPv4 and IPv6 (Single Hop) | June 2010 | BFD | | |
| RFC 5905 | Network Time Protocol Version 4: Protocol and Algorithms Specification | June 2010 | NTP v 4 | | Obsoletes RFC 1305, RFC 4330 |
| RFC 5969 | IPv6 Rapid Deployment on IPv4 Infrastructures (6rd) | January 2010 | IPv6 rapid deployment | | |
| RFC 6238 | TOTP: Time-Based One-Time Password Algorithm | May 2011 | TOTP | | |
| RFC 6265 | HTTP State Management Mechanism | April 2011 | HTTP cookie | | |
| RFC 6409 | Message submission for mail | November 2011 | message submission agent | | replaces 2476, 4409 |
| RFC 6455 | The WebSocket Protocol | December 2011 | WebSocket | | |
| RFC 6508 | Sakai-Kasahara Key Encryption (SAKKE) | February 2012 | SAKKE | | |
| RFC 6716 | Definition of the Opus Audio Codec | September 2012 | Opus (audio format) | | Updated by RFC 8251 |
| RFC 6726 | File Delivery over Unidirectional Transport (FLUTE) | November 2012 | FLUTE | | Obsoletes RFC 3926 |
| RFC 6749 | The OAuth 2.0 Authorization Framework | October 2012 | OAuth | | |
| RFC 6797 | HTTP Strict Transport Security (HSTS) | November 2012 | HTTP Strict Transport Security | | |
| RFC 6805 | The Application of the Path Computation Element Architecture to the Determination of a Sequence of Domains in MPLS and GMPLS | November 2012 | Path computation element | | |
| RFC 7230 | Hypertext Transfer Protocol (HTTP/1.1): Message Syntax and Routing | June 2014 | HTTP v1.1 | | Obsoletes 2616 |
| RFC 7231 | Hypertext Transfer Protocol (HTTP/1.1): Semantics and Content | June 2014 | HTTP v1.1 | | Obsoletes 2616 |
| RFC 7232 | Hypertext Transfer Protocol (HTTP/1.1): Conditional Requests | June 2014 | HTTP v1.1 | | Obsoletes 2616 |
| RFC 7233 | Hypertext Transfer Protocol (HTTP/1.1): Range Requests | June 2014 | HTTP v1.1, Byte serving | | Obsoletes 2616 |
| RFC 7234 | Hypertext Transfer Protocol (HTTP/1.1): Caching | June 2014 | HTTP v1.1 | | Obsoletes 2616 |
| RFC 7235 | Hypertext Transfer Protocol (HTTP/1.1): Authentication | June 2014 | HTTP v1.1 | | Obsoletes 2616 |
| RFC 7252 | Constrained Application Protocol (CoAP) | June 2014 | Constrained Application Protocol | | |
| RFC 7301 | Transport Layer Security (TLS): Application-Layer Protocol Negotiation Extension | July 2014 | Application-Layer Protocol Negotiation | | |
| RFC 7348 | Virtual eXtensible Local Area Network (VXLAN): A Framework for Overlaying Virtualized Layer 2 Networks over Layer 3 Networks | August 2014 | VXLAN | | |
| RFC 7469 | Public Key Pinning Extension for HTTP | April 2015 | HTTP Public Key Pinning | | |
| RFC 7530 | Network File System (NFS) version 4 Protocol | March 2015 | NFS v 4 | | |
| RFC 7540 | Hypertext Transfer Protocol Version 2 (HTTP/2) | May 2015 | HTTP/2 | | |
| RFC 7541 | HPACK: Header Compression for HTTP/2 | May 2015 | HTTP/2 | | |
| RFC 7567 | IETF Recommendations Regarding Active Queue Management | July 2015 | Active Queue Management | | |
| RFC 7725 | An HTTP Status Code to Report Legal Obstacles | December 2015 | HTTP 451 | | |
| RFC 7871 | Client Subnet in DNS Queries | May 2016 | Domain Name System | | |
| RFC 8391 | XMSS: eXtended Merkle Signature Scheme | May 2018 | Hash-based cryptography | | |
| RFC 8392 | CBOR Web Token (CWT) | May 2018 | | | |
| RFC 9000 | QUIC: A UDP-Based Multiplexed and Secure Transport | May 2021 | QUIC | | |
| RFC 9293 | Transmission Control Protocol (TCP) | August 2022 | TCP | | Obsoletes RFC 793 |
| RFC 9338 | CBOR Object Signing and Encryption (COSE): Countersignatures | December 2022 | COSE | | Updates RFC 9052 |
| RFC 9420 | The Messaging Layer Security (MLS) Protocol | July 2023 | Messaging Layer Security | | |
| RFC 9535 | JSONPath | February 2024 | JSONPath | | |
| RFC 9580 | OpenPGP | July 2024 | OpenPGP | | Obsoletes RFC 4880, RFC 5581, RFC 6637 |
| RFC 9777 | Multicast Listener Discovery Version 2 (MLDv2) for IPv6 | March 2025 | Multicast Listener Discovery | | Obsoletes RFC 3810 |

== Topical list ==
Obsolete RFCs are indicated with ~~struck-through~~ text.

| Topic | Related RFCs |
|---|---|
| Address Resolution Protocol | RFC 826 |
| Blocks Extensible Exchange Protocol | RFC 3080 |
| Bidirectional Forwarding Detection | RFC 5880, RFC 5881 |
| BOOTP | RFC 951 |
| CRAM-MD5 | RFC 2195 |
| Date and Time on the Internet (ISO 8601) | RFC 3339 |
| DEFLATE | RFC 1951 |
| DISCARD | RFC 863 |
| Domain Name System | RFC 1034, RFC 1035, RFC 2606, RFC 7871 |
| Dynamic Delegation Discovery System | ~~RFC 2168~~, ~~RFC 2915~~, RFC 3401, RFC 3402, RFC 3403, RFC 3404, RFC 3405 |
| Dynamic Host Configuration Protocol | ~~RFC 1531~~, ~~RFC 1541~~, RFC 2131, RFC 3315 (IPv6) |
| Extensible Messaging and Presence Protocol | RFC 3920 RFC 3921 RFC 3922 |
| ECHO protocol | RFC 862 |
| Fictitious domain name | RFC 2606 |
| File Transfer Protocol | RFC 114, ~~RFC 172~~, RFC 265, RFC 354, ~~RFC 765~~, RFC 959, RFC 2228, RFC 4217 |
| Frame Relay | ~~RFC 1294~~, ~~RFC 1490~~, RFC 2427 |
| Generic Security Services Application Program Interface | ~~RFC 1508~~, ~~RFC 1509~~, RFC 1964, ~~RFC 2078~~, RFC 2743, RFC 2744, RFC 2853 |
| gzip | RFC 1952 |
| HyperText Transfer Protocol | RFC 1945 (v 1.0), ~~RFC 2616~~ (v 1.1), RFC 7230 (v 1.1), RFC 7231 (v 1.1), RFC 7232 (v 1.1), RFC 7233 (v 1.1), RFC 7234 (v 1.1), RFC 7235 (v 1.1) |
| Internet Control Message Protocol | RFC 792 |
| Internet Group Management Protocol | ~~RFC 966~~ (v 0), ~~RFC 988~~ (v 0), ~~RFC 1054~~ (v 1), 1112 (v 1), ~~RFC 2236~~ (v 2), RFC 3376 (v 3) |
| Internet Key Exchange | IKE RFC 2409, RFC 2407 (ISAKMP), RFC 2408 (ISAKMP), IKEv2 RFC 4306, IKEv2 RFC 4301, RFC 4310 (DNS) |
| Internet Message Access Protocol | RFC 1176 (v 2), RFC 1730 (v 4), ~~RFC 2060~~ (v 4r1), RFC 3501 (v 4r1) |
| Internet Protocol | see IPv4 and IPv6 |
| IP over Avian Carriers | RFC 1149, RFC 2549 |
| IPv4 | ~~RFC 760~~, RFC 790, RFC 791 |
| IPv6 | ~~RFC 1883~~, ~~RFC 2460~~, RFC 8200 |
| IPv6 addressing | ~~RFC 2373~~, ~~RFC 3513~~, RFC 4291 |
| Internet Relay Chat | RFC 1459, RFC 2810, RFC 2811, RFC 2812, RFC 2813 |
| Internet Open Trading Protocol | RFC 2801, RFC 3504, RFC 2802, RFC 2935, RFC 3538, RFC 3867 |
| ISCSI | RFC 3720, RFC 3783 |
| Kerberos | RFC 1964 |
| Lightweight Directory Access Protocol | ~~RFC 1487~~, ~~RFC 1777~~, ~~RFC 2251~~, ~~RFC 2252~~, ~~RFC 2253~~, ~~RFC 2254~~, ~~RFC 2255~~, ~~RFC 2256~~, RFC 4510, RFC 4511, RFC 4512, RFC 4513, RFC 4514, RFC 4515, RFC 4516, RFC 4517, RFC 4518, RFC 4519, RFC 4520, RFC 4521, RFC 4522, RFC 4523, RFC 4524, RFC 4525, RFC 4526, RFC 4527, RFC 4528, RFC 4529, RFC 4530, RFC 4531, RFC 4532, RFC 4533, RFC 4534 |
| Microsoft Point-to-Point Encryption | ~~RFC 2118~~, RFC 3078 |
| MIKEY | RFC 3830, RFC 4650, RFC 4738, RFC 6043, RFC 6267, RFC 6509 |
| MD5 | RFC 1321 |
| Multiprotocol Label Switching | RFC 3031 |
| Multipurpose Internet Mail Extensions | RFC 2045 RFC 2046 RFC 2047 RFC 2049 |
| Network address translation | ~~RFC 1631~~, RFC 2663, RFC 2993, RFC 3022, RFC 3027, RFC 3234, ~~RFC 3489~~, RFC 4787, RFC 5389 |
| Network File System | ~~RFC 1094~~, ~~RFC 1813~~ (v.3), ~~RFC 3010~~ (v.4), ~~RFC 3530~~ (v.4), RFC 7530 (v.4) |
| Network News Transfer Protocol | ~~RFC 977~~, RFC 3977 |
| Network Time Protocol | RFC 1059 (v.1), RFC 1119 (v.2), RFC 1305 (v.3), RFC 5905 (v.4) |
| Open Shortest Path First | ~~RFC 1131~~ (v.1), ~~RFC 1247~~ (v.2), ~~RFC 1583~~ (v.2), ~~RFC 2178~~ (v.2), RFC 2328, ~~RFC 2740~~ (IPv6), RFC 5340 (IPv6) |
| Pretty Good Privacy | ~~RFC 1991~~, ~~RFC 2440~~, RFC 4880 |
| Protocol Independent Multicast | ~~RFC 2117~~, RFC 2362 (SM), RFC 4602 (SM) |
| Reverse Address Resolution Protocol | RFC 903 |
| QUIC | RFC 9000 |
| Post Office Protocol | ~~RFC 918~~ (v.1), RFC 937 (v.2), ~~RFC 1081~~ (v.3), ~~RFC 1225~~ (v.3), ~~RFC 1460~~ (v.3), ~~RFC 1725~~ (v.3), RFC 1939 (v.3) |
| RADIUS | ~~RFC 2058~~, ~~RFC 2059~~, ~~RFC 2138~~, ~~RFC 2139~~, RFC 2865, RFC 2866, RFC 2867, RFC 2868, RFC 2869, RFC 3162 (IPv6) |
| Real-time Transport Protocol | RFC 1889 |
| Real Time Streaming Protocol | RFC 2326 |
| Routing Information Protocol | RFC 1058 (v.1), ~~RFC 1388~~ (v.2), ~~RFC 1723~~ (v.2), RFC 2453 (v.2), RFC 2080 (v.ng) |
| Sender Policy Framework | RFC 4408 |
| Secure Shell-2 | RFC 4251 |
| Session Announcement Protocol | RFC 2974 |
| Session Description Protocol | RFC 2327 |
| Session Initiation Protocol | RFC 3261 |
| SHA hash functions | ~~RFC 3174~~, ~~RFC 4634~~, RFC 6234 |
| Simple Authentication and Security Layer | ~~RFC 2222~~, RFC 4422 |
| Simple Mail Transfer Protocol, Internet Message Format | ~~RFC 196~~, ~~RFC 772~~, ~~RFC 821~~, ~~RFC 822~~, ~~RFC 2821~~, ~~RFC 2822~~, RFC 5321, RFC 5322 |
| Simple Network Management Protocol | ~~RFC 1067~~, ~~RFC 1098~~, RFC 1157 (v.1), RFC 1441 (v.2) RFC 2570 (v.3) |
| Stream Control Transmission Protocol | ~~RFC 2960~~, RFC 4960, RFC 3286 |
| Tag URI scheme | RFC 4151 |
| TELNET | RFC 15, RFC 854, RFC 855 |
| Transmission Control Protocol | ~~RFC 675~~, ~~RFC 793~~, RFC 9293 |
| Transport Layer Security 1.0 | RFC 2246 |
| Trivial File Transfer Protocol | ~~RFC 783~~, RFC 1350 |
| Usenet | ~~RFC 850~~, RFC 1036 |
| Uniform Resource Identifier | RFC 3986 |
| User Datagram Protocol | RFC 768 |
| UTF-8 | RFC 3629 |
| zlib | RFC 1950 |
