= Character Generator Protocol =

Internet Protocol Suite service

- Communication protocol
- Abbreviation: CHARGEN
- Purpose: Testing; Debugging; Measurement
- Developer: Jon Postel
- Introduction: 1983; 43 years ago
- OSI layer: Application layer (7)
- Ports: tcp/19, udp/19
- RFC: 864

The Character Generator Protocol (CHARGEN) is a service of the Internet Protocol Suite defined in RFC 864 in 1983 by Jon Postel. It is intended for testing, debugging, and measurement purposes. The protocol is rarely used, as its design flaws allow for ready misuse.

A host may connect to a server that supports the Character Generator Protocol on either Transmission Control Protocol (TCP) or User Datagram Protocol (UDP) port number 19. Upon opening a TCP connection, the server starts sending arbitrary characters to the connecting host and continues until the host closes the connection. In the UDP implementation of the protocol, the server sends a UDP datagram containing a random number (between 0 and 512) of characters every time it receives a datagram from the connecting host. Any data received by the server is discarded.

== Inetd implementation ==
On most Unix-like operating systems, a CHARGEN server is built into the inetd or xinetd daemon. The CHARGEN service is usually not enabled by default. It may be enabled by adding the following lines to the file /etc/inetd.conf and telling inetd to reload its configuration:

chargen   stream  tcp     nowait  root    internal
chargen   dgram   udp     wait    root    internal

== Applications ==
The CHARGEN service may be used as a source of a byte-stream for debugging TCP network code for proper bounds checking and buffer management. It may also be a source of generic payload for bandwidth measurement and/or QoS fine-tuning. Consideration must be given if hardware compression is active, as the output from the CHARGEN service is easily and efficiently compressed. This compression can cause bandwidth tests to report the size of the data after decompression, instead of the actual amount of data which passed the wire.

== Sample session ==
A typical CHARGEN service session looks like this: The user connects to the host using a telnet client. The user receives a stream of bytes. Although the specific format of the output is not prescribed by RFC 864, the recommended pattern (and a de facto standard) is shifted lines of 72 ASCII characters repeating.

$ telnet localhost chargen
Trying 127.0.0.1...
Connected to localhost.
Escape character is '^]'.
 !"#$%&'()*+,-./0123456789:;<=>?@ABCDEFGHIJKLMNOPQRSTUVWXYZ[\]^_`abcdefg
!"#$%&'()*+,-./0123456789:;<=>?@ABCDEFGHIJKLMNOPQRSTUVWXYZ[\]^_`abcdefgh
"#$%&'()*+,-./0123456789:;<=>?@ABCDEFGHIJKLMNOPQRSTUVWXYZ[\]^_`abcdefghi
#$%&'()*+,-./0123456789:;<=>?@ABCDEFGHIJKLMNOPQRSTUVWXYZ[\]^_`abcdefghij
$%&'()*+,-./0123456789:;<=>?@ABCDEFGHIJKLMNOPQRSTUVWXYZ[\]^_`abcdefghijk
%&'()*+,-./0123456789:;<=>?@ABCDEFGHIJKLMNOPQRSTUVWXYZ[\]^_`abcdefghijkl
&'()*+,-./0123456789:;<=>?@ABCDEFGHIJKLMNOPQRSTUVWXYZ[\]^_`abcdefghijklm
'()*+,-./0123456789:;<=>?@ABCDEFGHIJKLMNOPQRSTUVWXYZ[\]^_`abcdefghijklmn
()*+,-./0123456789:;<=>?@ABCDEFGHIJKLMNOPQRSTUVWXYZ[\]^_`abcdefghijklmno
)*+,-./0123456789:;<=>?@ABCDEFGHIJKLMNOPQRSTUVWXYZ[\]^_`abcdefghijklmnop
*+,-./0123456789:;<=>?@ABCDEFGHIJKLMNOPQRSTUVWXYZ[\]^_`abcdefghijklmnopq
+,-./0123456789:;<=>?@ABCDEFGHIJKLMNOPQRSTUVWXYZ[\]^_`abcdefghijklmnopqr
,-./0123456789:;<=>?@ABCDEFGHIJKLMNOPQRSTUVWXYZ[\]^_`abcdefghijklmnopqrs
-./0123456789:;<=>?@ABCDEFGHIJKLMNOPQRSTUVWXYZ[\]^_`abcdefghijklmnopqrst
./0123456789:;<=>?@ABCDEFGHIJKLMNOPQRSTUVWXYZ[\]^_`abcdefghijklmnopqrstu
/0123456789:;<=>?@ABCDEFGHIJKLMNOPQRSTUVWXYZ[\]^_`abcdefghijklmnopqrstuv
0123456789:;<=>?@ABCDEFGHIJKLMNOPQRSTUVWXYZ[\]^_`abcdefghijklmnopqrstuvw
123456789:;<=>?@ABCDEFGHIJKLMNOPQRSTUVWXYZ[\]^_`abcdefghijklmnopqrstuvwx
23456789:;<=>?@ABCDEFGHIJKLMNOPQRSTUVWXYZ[\]^_`abcdefghijklmnopqrstuvwxy
3456789:;<=>?@ABCDEFGHIJKLMNOPQRSTUVWXYZ[\]^_`abcdefghijklmnopqrstuvwxyz
456789:;<=>?@ABCDEFGHIJKLMNOPQRSTUVWXYZ[\]^_`abcdefghijklmnopqrstuvwxyz{
56789:;<=>?@ABCDEFGHIJKLMNOPQRSTUVWXYZ[\]^_`abcdefghijklmnopqrstuvwxyz{|
6789:;<=>?@ABCDEFGHIJKLMNOPQRSTUVWXYZ[\]^_`abcdefghijklmnopqrstuvwxyz{|}
789:;<=>?@ABCDEFGHIJKLMNOPQRSTUVWXYZ[\]^_`abcdefghijklmnopqrstuvwxyz{|} 
89:;<=>?@ABCDEFGHIJKLMNOPQRSTUVWXYZ[\]^_`abcdefghijklmnopqrstuvwxyz{|} !
9:;<=>?@ABCDEFGHIJKLMNOPQRSTUVWXYZ[\]^_`abcdefghijklmnopqrstuvwxyz{|} !"
:;<=>?@ABCDEFGHIJKLMNOPQRSTUVWXYZ[\]^_`abcdefghijklmnopqrstuvwxyz{|} !"#
;<=>?@ABCDEFGHIJKLMNOPQRSTUVWXYZ[\]^_`abcdefghijklmnopqrstuvwxyz{|} !"#$
<=>?@ABCDEFGHIJKLMNOPQRSTUVWXYZ[\]^_`abcdefghijklmnopqrstuvwxyz{|} !"#$%
=>?@ABCDEFGHIJKLMNOPQRSTUVWXYZ[\]^_`abcdefghijklmnopqrstuvwxyz{|} !"#$%&
>?@ABCDEFGHIJKLMNOPQRSTUVWXYZ[\]^_`abcdefghijklmnopqrstuvwxyz{|} !"#$%&'
?@ABCDEFGHIJKLMNOPQRSTUVWXYZ[\]^_`abcdefghijklmnopqrstuvwxyz{|} !"#$%&'(
@ABCDEFGHIJKLMNOPQRSTUVWXYZ[\]^_`abcdefghijklmnopqrstuvwxyz{|} !"#$%&'()
ABCDEFGHIJKLMNOPQRSTUVWXYZ[\]^_`abcdefghijklmnopqrstuvwxyz{|} !"#$%&'()*
BCDEFGHIJKLMNOPQRSTUVWXYZ[\]^_`abcdefghijklmnopqrstuvwxyz{|} !"#$%&'()*+
CDEFGHIJKLMNOPQRSTUVWXYZ[\]^_`abcdefghijklmnopqrstuvwxyz{|} !"#$%&'()*+,
DEFGHIJKLMNOPQRSTUVWXYZ[\]^_`abcdefghijklmnopqrstuvwxyz{|} !"#$%&'()*+,-
EFGHIJKLMNOPQRSTUVWXYZ[\]^_`abcdefghijklmnopqrstuvwxyz{|} !"#$%&'()*+,-.
FGHIJKLMNOPQRSTUVWXYZ[\]^_`abcdefghijklmnopqrstuvwxyz{|} !"#$%&'()*+,-./
GHIJKLMNOPQRSTUVWXYZ[\]^_`abcdefghijklmnopqrstuvwxyz{|} !"#$%&'()*+,-./0
HIJKLMNOPQRSTUVWXYZ[\]^_`abcdefghijklmnopqrstuvwxyz{|} !"#$%&'()*+,-./01
IJKLMNOPQRSTUVWXYZ[\]^_`abcdefghijklmnopqrstuvwxyz{|} !"#$%&'()*+,-./012
JKLMNOPQRSTUVWXYZ[\]^_`abcdefghijklmnopqrstuvwxyz{|} !"#$%&'()*+,-./0123
KLMNOPQRSTUVWXYZ[\]^_`abcdefghijklmnopqrstuvwxyz{|} !"#$%&'()*+,-./01234
LMNOPQRSTUVWXYZ[\]^_`abcdefghijklmnopqrstuvwxyz{|} !"#$%&'()*+,-./012345
MNOPQRSTUVWXYZ[\]^_`abcdefghijklmnopqrstuvwxyz{|} !"#$%&'()*+,-./0123456
NOPQRSTUVWXYZ[\]^_`abcdefghijklmnopqrstuvwxyz{|} !"#$%&'()*+,-./01234567
OPQRSTUVWXYZ[\]^_`abcdefghijklmnopqrstuvwxyz{|} !"#$%&'()*+,-./012345678
PQRSTUVWXYZ[\]^_`abcdefghijklmnopqrstuvwxyz{|} !"#$%&'()*+,-./0123456789
QRSTUVWXYZ[\]^_`abcdefghijklmnopqrstuvwxyz{|} !"#$%&'()*+,-./0123456789:
RSTUVWXYZ[\]^_`abcdefghijklmnopqrstuvwxyz{|} !"#$%&'()*+,-./0123456789:;
STUVWXYZ[\]^_`abcdefghijklmnopqrstuvwxyz{|} !"#$%&'()*+,-./0123456789:;<
TUVWXYZ[\]^_`abcdefghijklmnopqrstuvwxyz{|} !"#$%&'()*+,-./0123456789:;<=
UVWXYZ[\]^_`abcdefghijklmnopqrstuvwxyz{|} !"#$%&'()*+,-./0123456789:;<=>
VWXYZ[\]^_`abcdefghijklmnopqrstuvwxyz{|} !"#$%&'()*+,-./0123456789:;<=>?
WXYZ[\]^_`abcdefghijklmnopqrstuvwxyz{|} !"#$%&'()*+,-./0123456789:;<=>?@
XYZ[\]^_`abcdefghijklmnopqrstuvwxyz{|} !"#$%&'()*+,-./0123456789:;<=>?@A
YZ[\]^_`abcdefghijklmnopqrstuvwxyz{|} !"#$%&'()*+,-./0123456789:;<=>?@AB
Z[\]^_`abcdefghijklmnopqrstuvwxyz{|} !"#$%&'()*+,-./0123456789:;<=>?@ABC
[\]^_`abcdefghijklmnopqrstuvwxyz{|} !"#$%&'()*+,-./0123456789:;<=>?@ABCD
\]^_`abcdefghijklmnopqrstuvwxyz{|} !"#$%&'()*+,-./0123456789:;<=>?@ABCDE
]^_`abcdefghijklmnopqrstuvwxyz{|} !"#$%&'()*+,-./0123456789:;<=>?@ABCDEF
^_`abcdefghijklmnopqrstuvwxyz{|} !"#$%&'()*+,-./0123456789:;<=>?@ABCDEFG
_`abcdefghijklmnopqrstuvwxyz{|} !"#$%&'()*+,-./0123456789:;<=>?@ABCDEFGH
`abcdefghijklmnopqrstuvwxyz{|} !"#$%&'()*+,-./0123456789:;<=>?@ABCDEFGHI
abcdefghijklmnopqrstuvwxyz{|} !"#$%&'()*+,-./0123456789:;<=>?@ABCDEFGHIJ
bcdefghijklmnopqrstuvwxyz{|} !"#$%&'()*+,-./0123456789:;<=>?@ABCDEFGHIJK
cdefghijklmnopqrstuvwxyz{|} !"#$%&'()*+,-./0123456789:;<=>?@ABCDEFGHIJKL
defghijklmnopqrstuvwxyz{|} !"#$%&'()*+,-./0123456789:;<=>?@ABCDEFGHIJKLM
efghijklmnopqrstuvwxyz{|} !"#$%&'()*+,-./0123456789:;<=>?@ABCDEFGHIJKLMN
fghijklmnopqrstuvwxyz{|} !"#$%&'()*+,-./0123456789:;<=>?@ABCDEFGHIJKLMNO
ghijklmnopqrstuvwxyz{|} !"#$%&'()*+,-./0123456789:;<=>?@ABCDEFGHIJKLMNOP
hijklmnopqrstuvwxyz{|} !"#$%&'()*+,-./0123456789:;<=>?@ABCDEFGHIJKLMNOPQ
ijklmnopqrstuvwxyz{|} !"#$%&'()*+,-./0123456789:;<=>?@ABCDEFGHIJKLMNOPQR
jklmnopqrstuvwxyz{|} !"#$%&'()*+,-./0123456789:;<=>?@ABCDEFGHIJKLMNOPQRS
klmnopqrstuvwxyz{|} !"#$%&'()*+,-./0123456789:;<=>?@ABCDEFGHIJKLMNOPQRST
lmnopqrstuvwxyz{|} !"#$%&'()*+,-./0123456789:;<=>?@ABCDEFGHIJKLMNOPQRSTU
mnopqrstuvwxyz{|} !"#$%&'()*+,-./0123456789:;<=>?@ABCDEFGHIJKLMNOPQRSTUV
nopqrstuvwxyz{|} !"#$%&'()*+,-./0123456789:;<=>?@ABCDEFGHIJKLMNOPQRSTUVW
opqrstuvwxyz{|} !"#$%&'()*+,-./0123456789:;<=>?@ABCDEFGHIJKLMNOPQRSTUVWX
pqrstuvwxyz{|} !"#$%&'()*+,-./0123456789:;<=>?@ABCDEFGHIJKLMNOPQRSTUVWXY
qrstuvwxyz{|} !"#$%&'()*+,-./0123456789:;<=>?@ABCDEFGHIJKLMNOPQRSTUVWXYZ
rstuvwxyz{|} !"#$%&'()*+,-./0123456789:;<=>?@ABCDEFGHIJKLMNOPQRSTUVWXYZ[
stuvwxyz{|} !"#$%&'()*+,-./0123456789:;<=>?@ABCDEFGHIJKLMNOPQRSTUVWXYZ[\
tuvwxyz{|} !"#$%&'()*+,-./0123456789:;<=>?@ABCDEFGHIJKLMNOPQRSTUVWXYZ[\]
uvwxyz{|} !"#$%&'()*+,-./0123456789:;<=>?@ABCDEFGHIJKLMNOPQRSTUVWXYZ[\]^
vwxyz{|} !"#$%&'()*+,-./0123456789:;<=>?@ABCDEFGHIJKLMNOPQRSTUVWXYZ[\]^_
wxyz{|} !"#$%&'()*+,-./0123456789:;<=>?@ABCDEFGHIJKLMNOPQRSTUVWXYZ[\]^_`
xyz{|} !"#$%&'()*+,-./0123456789:;<=>?@ABCDEFGHIJKLMNOPQRSTUVWXYZ[\]^_`a
yz{|} !"#$%&'()*+,-./0123456789:;<=>?@ABCDEFGHIJKLMNOPQRSTUVWXYZ[\]^_`ab
z{|} !"#$%&'()*+,-./0123456789:;<=>?@ABCDEFGHIJKLMNOPQRSTUVWXYZ[\]^_`abc
{|} !"#$%&'()*+,-./0123456789:;<=>?@ABCDEFGHIJKLMNOPQRSTUVWXYZ[\]^_`abcd
|} !"#$%&'()*+,-./0123456789:;<=>?@ABCDEFGHIJKLMNOPQRSTUVWXYZ[\]^_`abcde
} !"#$%&'()*+,-./0123456789:;<=>?@ABCDEFGHIJKLMNOPQRSTUVWXYZ[\]^_`abcdef
 !"#$%&'()*+,-./0123456789:;<=>?@ABCDEFGHIJKLMNOPQRSTUVWXYZ[\]^_`abcdefg
!"#$%&'()*+,-./0123456789:;<=>?@ABCDEFGHIJKLMNOPQRSTUVWXYZ[\]^_`abcdefgh
"#$%&'()*+,-./0123456789:;<=>?@ABCDEFGHIJKLMNOPQRSTUVWXYZ[\]^_`abcdefghi

^]
telnet> quit
Connection closed.

This continues until the TCP connection is closed as shown in the trace by ending the telnet session.

== Visual output simulation ==
For security reasons, most modern machines should have CHARGEN services disabled. The following is a Linux bash script that will simulate the visual appearance of the CHARGEN service in the terminal window. The script can be stopped by pressing Ctrl+C.

strg=""; for n in {32..126}; do  c=$(printf "\\$(printf '%03o' $n)"); strg=${strg}${c}; done; strg=${strg}${strg}; n=0; while :; do m=n%95; echo "${strg:m:72}"; n=$((n+1)); sleep .1; done

== Abuse ==
The service was used maliciously to crash Microsoft domain name servers (DNS) running Windows NT 4.0 by piping the arbitrary characters straight into the DNS server listening port (telnet ntbox 19 | telnet ntbox 53). However, the attack may have been a symptom of improper buffer management on the part of Microsoft's DNS service and not directly related to the CHARGEN service.

UDP CHARGEN is commonly used in denial-of-service attacks. By using a fake source address the attacker can send bounce traffic off a UDP CHARGEN application to the victim. UDP CHARGEN sends 200 to 1,000 times more data than it receives, depending upon the implementation. This "traffic multiplication" is also attractive to an attacker because it obscures the attacker's IP address from the victim.

CHARGEN was widely implemented on network-connected printers. As printer firmware was rarely updated on older models before CHARGEN and other security concerns were known, there may still be many network-connected printers which implement the protocol. Where these are visible to the Internet, they are invariably misused as denial of service vectors. Potential attackers often scan networks looking for UDP port 19 CHARGEN sources.

The availability of CHARGEN on printers has led some distributed denial of service malware to use UDP port 19 for attack traffic. This tactic is often intended to misdirect investigators by making the traffic appear to originate from legacy network devices rather than compromised computers.

== See also ==
- Barber pole
- Echo Protocol
- Discard Protocol
- QOTD
- Daytime Protocol
- Time Protocol
