= FireDaemon =

Operating system service management application

FireDaemon Pro
- Developer: FireDaemon Technologies Limited
- Stable release: 6.4.3 / October 2026; 0 months ago
- Operating system: Microsoft Windows 10, 11, 2016, 2019, 2022, 2025
- Available in: English
- Type: Operating system service management
- License: License Key
- Website: www.firedaemon.com

FireDaemon Pro is an operating system service management application. FireDaemon Pro allows users to install and run most standard Windows applications as a service. These include regular standard Windows executables as well as applications written in scripting languages such as Perl, Java, Python and Ruby. FireDaemon is popular amongst the online gaming community for running dedicated servers such as Minecraft, Rust, and America's Army.

It is possible to add services to Windows without FireDaemon Pro or use other free tools found in the Windows Resource Kits. However, setting up services manually can be complicated and error-prone as the Windows Registry needs to be edited directly. Windows services by default will generally be restarted after a minimum of 1 minute has passed. However, FireDaemon Pro proactively monitors the application and ensures an immediate restart. This can be critical when using server-based applications such as web servers, SFTP servers, etc.

== Installation Procedure ==
FireDaemon Pro is available as a .exe package. The installation package doesn't contain any malware or spyware.

== Licensing ==
FireDaemon Pro is released as licensed software.

== See also ==
- Operating system service management
