= Daytime Protocol =

Service in the Internet Protocol Suite

The Daytime Protocol is a service in the Internet Protocol Suite defined in 1983 in RFC 867 by Jon Postel. It is intended for testing and measurement purposes in computer networks.

A host may connect to a server that supports the Daytime Protocol on either Transmission Control Protocol (TCP) or User Datagram Protocol (UDP) port 13. The server returns an ASCII character string of the current date and time in an unspecified format.

== Inetd implementation ==
On UNIX-like operating systems, a daytime server is usually built into the inetd (or xinetd) daemon. The service is usually not enabled by default. It may be enabled by adding the following lines to the file /etc/inetd.conf and telling inetd to reload its configuration:

daytime   stream  tcp     nowait  root    internal
daytime   dgram   udp     wait    root    internal

An example output may be:

Thursday, February 2, 2006, 13:45:51-PST

== See also ==
- List of well-known ports
- Echo Protocol
- QOTD
- Time Protocol
- Network Time Protocol
