= ZNC =

ZNC may refer to:

- ZNC (software)
- ZNC-FM, a radio station in Nassau, Bahamas
- Nyac Airport, Alaska
- Zinc–carbon battery
- Zinc L-carnosine
- Zomi National Congress
