= MIRC scripting language =

Scripting language embedded in mIRC

mIRC Scripting Language
- Paradigm: Event-driven programming, Procedural programming
- Designed by: Khaled Mardam-Bey
- Developer: Khaled Mardam-Bey
- First appeared: 1995
- Typing discipline: Dynamic typing
- OS: Microsoft Windows
- License: Proprietary software
- Filename extensions: .mrc, .ini
- Website: www.mirc.com

Major implementations
- mIRC AdiIRC

mIRC scripts editor (built-in)

The mIRC scripting language (often unofficially abbreviated to "mSL") is the scripting language embedded in mIRC and Adiirc, IRC clients for Windows, and also through the WINE compatiblity layer for Linux.

== Primary uses ==
- Light channel and personal protection against many types of attacks (flooding, spamming, takeovers, etc.).
- Dialog windows can be created in mIRC to better serve user-compatibility; rather than everything in popup menus.
  - Popular mIRC dialog extensions include MDX (mIRC Dialog Extension) and DCX (Dialog Control Extension). There are also a few versions of mdx.dll and dcx.dll modded by IRC hackers.
- Bots that provide automated IRC channel management, trivia or other games, and other desired functions for chatters.
- Commands that save typing or otherwise simplify life on IRC (such as automatically identifying as the owner of a nickname).
- Proxy CONNECT servers (www.mslscript.com) and Bounce servers (ZNC) to replace some mSL scripting with faster code and convenient features.

== Script storage ==
Scripts are stored as either plain text files, usually with a .mrc file extension, or as INI files. They, however, can be stored with any extension. Multiple script files can be loaded at one time, although in some cases, one script will conflict with another and cause one or both of them to no longer work properly. The order in which in the script files are loaded may make a difference if the script functions properly or not. A (un)loader-script MUST be used for semi-large scripts to function as intended.

== Language features ==
mIRC scripting language uses its own nomenclature to refer to language constructs. (However, whilst this can be a little confusing to newcomers, they do not impact on the functionality of mSL.)

- Built-in functions are termed commands or, if they return a value, identifiers.
- Custom scripted functions are called aliases. Aliases that return a value are known as custom identifiers. Both are called from the command line or other parts of a script in the same ways as built-in commands and identifiers (and can even supersede them).
- Popups are scripted context menu items. Popups are called when they are selected by the user. The term originally referred to the menus—which pop up upon a right click. It is still used this way in the manual.
- Remotes are event-handling scripts. Remotes are called when the event they handle occurs.
- All variables are dynamically typed.
- Hash tables are available for larger data storage; arrays are not.
- mIRC scripts make use of sigils. Identifiers (whether custom or built-in) are preceded by $, binary variables are preceded by &, and other variables (whether local or global) are preceded by %. Commands and aliases are not preceded by any particular character (although when entered from a window's command line they must be preceded by the command prefix, usually /).

=== File handling ===
- Scripts can read from and write to files [$read(file,[args]) | /write ]

The above is intended for singular access to the file. Because each time you issue $read or /write you open and close the file for access. Multiple accesses, during a loop for instance, is best handled through /fopen, /fwrite and /fclose. Since this opens the file only once. In some cases /filter and /savebuf is an even more efficient (non scripted loop) method.

- Scripts can also copy and delete files. [/copy | /remove]

=== Binary variables ===
- Contain unlimited (8192 bytes prior to mIRC 6.1) raw data
- Globally accessible via commands and identifiers
- Automatically unset when script returns control to mIRC (and not to another part of a script)
- Prefixed with & (e.g. &Variable)
- Cannot be accessed other than by /bread and /bwrite, so these variables cannot be passed onto other parts of the script

=== Hash tables ===
- May contain unlimited binary data or up to 4,150 (950 prior to mIRC 6.32) bytes of plain text. This limit is imposed by mIRC's scripting parser's own line length limitation (unless assigning a binary variable)
- Globally accessible via commands and identifiers
- Automatically unset when exiting mIRC as they are only stored in memory
- Can be saved for later use
- Not prefixed
- Faster than accessing from a file, as hash tables are stored in memory rather than the hard disk
- Size limited only by the computer's memory limits.
- Allows any bucket size to be used

=== Global variables ===
- May contain up to 4,150 (950 prior to mIRC 6.32) bytes of data including its name (however due to line-length limitations in mIRC's scripting parser, a maximum of 4,146 bytes can be assigned explicitly using /set or /var — this number decreasing as the variable's name grows longer)
- Cannot store NUL (ASCII 0) or trailing spaces
- Globally accessible
- Do not automatically unset unless a switch is used (stored automatically in a mIRC initialization file)
- Prefixed with % (e.g. %Variable)
- Created using the set command or var -g or %Variable = value notation

=== Local variables ===
- May contain up to 4,150 (950 prior to mIRC 6.32) bytes of data including the variable name (however due to line-length limitations in mIRC's scripting parser, a maximum of 4,146 bytes can be assigned explicitly using the /set or /var commands — this number decreasing as the variable's name grows longer)
- Can store NUL (ASCII 0) or trailing spaces
- Are destroyed when the triggered alias or event ends
- Prefixed with % (e.g. %Variable)
- Created using the var command. var is merely an internal alias for set -l but var poses the means to declare multiple local variables on a single line (e.g. var %a = 1, %b, %c = 2)

== Limitations ==
- Scripting parser supports a maximum of 8,292 (950 prior to mIRC 6.32) characters per line (not including newlines or indentation).
- Strings are not syntactically enclosed, creating ambiguities in code where characters meant as literal strings are treated as part of the language's syntax.
- Each line of code is broken down into a set of space-delimited tokens. As mIRC's parser does not support null tokens and the language doesn't provide a syntax to clearly differentiate literal strings from code; Prior to mIRC version 6.2 it was impossible to pass multiple consecutive spaces to any command or alias. However, this was fixed with the introduction of the returnex command which allows the preservation of spaces.

== Code examples ==
The code below is in the remote scripts format. If placed into an alias file, the command names should not be preceded by the word "alias". Test Comments include the common /* comment */ and ;comment.

Here is an example of a Hello World alias:

;Defines the alias 'hello' in the remote script

;Note: if this is placed in an alias script,
;the 'alias' part must be removed (result: hello {)
;Usage: /hello

alias hello {

  ;Displays(/echo) 'Hello World!' into the active window(-a)
  echo -a Hello World!

}

A remote script to automatically respond to certain text

;Placed in a remote script

;When a user types Hello! in a channel,
;you answer back: Hello, [nickname]!

on *:TEXT:Hello!:#:{ msg $chan Hello, $nick $+ ! }

;When a user types Hello! in a private message,
;you answer back: Hello, [nickname]!

on *:TEXT:Hello!:?: { msg $nick Hello, $nick $+ ! }

;Here is a script which automatically gives voice to a user
;who joins a particular channel (The Bot or user should have HOP)

on *:JOIN:#?: { mode $chan +v $nick }

;A bad word script

on *:Text:die*:#: { .mode $chan +b $nick | kick $chan $nick Dont say that again }

== See also ==
- Internet Relay Chat
- mIRC
