= IP block =

IP block may refer to:

- An IP block (otherwise known as an IP range), a continuous segment of Internet Protocol addresses assigned to an organization or country
- IP address blocking, the banning of outside connections from certain IP addresses or ranges of them
- Semiconductor intellectual property core, a reusable unit of logic, cell, or chip layout design and is also the property of one party
