= IP address blocking =

Access restrictions based on IP address

IP address blocking or IP banning is a configuration of a network service that blocks requests from hosts with certain IP addresses. It is commonly used to protect against brute force attacks and to prevent access by a disruptive address. It can also be used to restrict access to or from a particular geographic area; for example, syndicating content to a specific region through the use of Internet geolocation.

IP address blocking can be implemented with a hosts file (e.g., for Mac, Windows, Android, or OS X) or with a TCP wrapper (for Unix-like operating systems). It can be bypassed using methods such as proxy servers; however, this can be circumvented with DHCP lease renewal.

== How it works ==
Every device connected to the Internet is assigned a unique IP address, which is needed to enable devices to communicate with each other. With appropriate software on the host website, the IP address of visitors to the site can be logged and can also be used to determine the visitor's geographical location.

Logging the IP address can, for example, monitor if a person has visited the site before, for example, to vote more than once, as well as to monitor their viewing pattern, how long since they performed any activity on the site (and set a time out limit), besides other things.

Knowing the visitor's geolocation indicates, besides other things, the visitor's country. In some cases, requests from or responses to a certain country would be blocked entirely. Geo-blocking has been used, for example, to block shows in certain countries, such as censoring shows deemed inappropriate. This is especially frequent in places such as China.

Internet users may circumvent geo-blocking and censorship and protect their personal identity using a Virtual Private Network.

On a website, an IP address block can prevent a disruptive address from access, though a warning and/or account block may be used first. Dynamic allocation of IP addresses by Internet service providers (ISPs) can complicate IP address blocking by making it difficult to block a specific user without blocking many IP addresses (blocks of IP address ranges), thereby creating collateral damage. Similarly, in cellular networks utilizing Carrier-Grade NAT (RFC 6598), hundreds or thousands of mobile subscribers share small pools of public IPv4 addresses via dynamic port multiplexing; blocking a single shared egress IP creates collateral damage across unrelated mobile subscribers on the same carrier gateway. For websites with low-enough popularity (often intentionally, with explicitly declaring the majority of potential visitors as out-of-scope) the large-scale collateral damage is often tolerable: most of website accesses, for addresses belong to the same IP range, are accesses of persons just having a dynamic IP address, but the same ISP, country, city and city districts, based on which IP ranges are assigned by ISPs. On websites with low-enough total visitor count, it is improbable that all these features match more than a single person. For large websites, Terms of Services usually reserve the right of their admins to block access at own discretion, enabling them to create collateral damage this way.

== Implementations ==
Unix-like operating systems commonly implement IP address blocking using a TCP wrapper, configured by host access control files /etc/hosts.deny and /etc/hosts.allow.

Both companies and schools offering remote user access use Linux programs such as DenyHosts or Fail2ban for protection from unauthorized access while allowing permitted remote access. This is also useful for allowing remote access to computers. It is also used for Internet censorship.

IP address blocking is possible on many systems using a hosts file, which is a simple text file containing hostnames and IP addresses. Hosts files are used by many operating systems, including Microsoft Windows, Linux, Android, and OS X.

== Circumvention ==
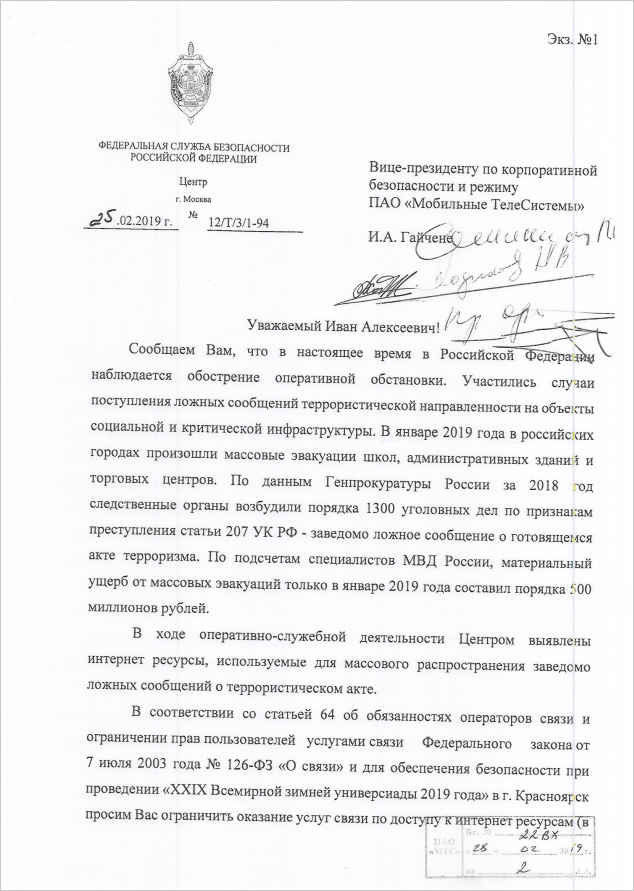
A letter from the Russian Federal Security Service (FSB) about IP blocking of ProtonMail

Proxy servers and VPNs can be used to bypass the blocking of traffic from IP addresses. However, anti-proxy strategies are available. Consumer-grade internet routers can sometimes obtain a new public IP address on-demand from the ISP using DHCP lease renewal to circumvent individual IP address blocks. This, however, can be countered by blocking the range of IP addresses from which the internet service provider is assigning new IP addresses, which is usually a shared IP address prefix. However, this may impact legitimate users from the same internet service provider who have IP addresses in the same range, which inadvertently creates a denial-of-service attack.

In the case Craigslist v. 3Taps (2013), US federal judge Charles R. Breyer held that circumventing an address block to access a website is a violation of the Computer Fraud and Abuse Act for "unauthorized access", and is thus punishable by civil damages.

== See also ==
- Block (Internet)
- Content-control software
