= Oidentd =

Daemon for ident protocol

oidentd
- Original author(s): Ryan McCabe
- Developer(s): Janik Rabe
- Initial release: 1998; 27 years ago
- Stable release: 3.1.0 / March 11, 2023; 2 years ago
- Repository: github.com/janikrabe/oidentd
- Written in: C
- Operating system: Linux, FreeBSD, OpenBSD, NetBSD, DragonFly BSD, Darwin, Solaris
- Available in: English
- Type: Ident protocol daemon
- License: GNU GPL v2
- Website: oidentd.janikrabe.com

oidentd is an RFC 1413 compliant ident daemon which runs on Linux, FreeBSD, OpenBSD, NetBSD, DragonFly BSD, and some versions of Darwin and Solaris. It can handle IP masqueraded or NAT connections, and has a flexible mechanism for specifying ident responses. Users can be granted permission to specify their own ident responses, hide responses for connections owned by them, or return random ident responses. Responses can be specified according to host and port pairs. One of the most notable capabilities is spoofed ident responses or ident spoofing.

The oidentd.conf configuration file can be used to specify the amount of control users have over the responses oidentd returns upon successful lookups for connections owned by them, while the $HOME/.oidentd.conf file allows a user to specify what ident response will be returned for specific connections.

== See also ==
- Internet Relay Chat
- BNC (software)
