= Daytime (disambiguation) =

Daytime is the time between sunrise and sunset, on Earth or elsewhere.

Daytime may also refer to:

- Daytime (Canadian talk show), a Canadian series of television talk shows on most Rogers TV cable channels in Canada
- Daytime (U.S. TV program), an American television program produced by WFLA-TV in Tampa, Florida, and broadcast over Retro Television Network affiliates
- "Daytime", a song by Jane (German band)
- Daytime Protocol, a protocol used on computer networks
- Daytime television, a block of television programming taking place during the late-morning and afternoon on weekdays
- Daytime (TV channel), a predecessor to Lifetime Television
