= Discard =

Discard may refer to:

- Discard Protocol, a service in the Internet Protocol Suite
- Discard (EP), an album by Figurine
- Discard, an alternate name for trim functionality in solid-state drives
- In C#, a placeholder variable that is required by the syntax but it is never assigned.

== See also ==
- Discards, the parts of a fish which are not kept after cleaning them
