= Super-server =

Type of daemon generally run on Unix-like systems

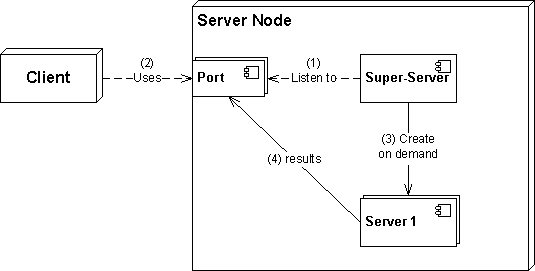
Principle of super-server

Example of a server running sshd (port 22), identd (port 113), ftpd (port 21) and httpd (port 80)

A super-server, sometimes called a service dispatcher, is a type of daemon run generally on Unix-like systems.

== Usage ==
A super-server starts other servers when needed, normally with access to them checked by a TCP wrapper. It uses very few resources when in idle state. This can be ideal for workstations used for local web development, client/server development or low-traffic daemons with occasional usage (such as ident and SSH).

== Performance ==
The creation of an operating system process embodying the sub-daemon is deferred until an incoming connection for the sub-daemon arrives. This results in a delay to the handling of the connection (in comparison to a connection handled by an already-running process).

Whether this delay is incurred repeatedly for every incoming connection depends on the design of the particular sub-daemon; simple daemons usually require a separate sub-daemon instance (i.e. a distinct, separate operating system process) be started for each and every incoming connection. Such a request-per-process design is more straightforward to implement, but for some workloads, the extra CPU and memory overhead of starting multiple operating system processes may be undesirable.

Alternatively, a single sub-daemon operating system process can be designed to handle multiple connections, allowing similar performance to a "stand alone" server (except for the one-off delay for the first connection to the sub-daemon).

== Implementations ==
- inetd
- launchd
- systemd
- ucspi-tcp
- xinetd
