= Ucspi-tcp =

ucspi-tcp is a public domain Unix TCP command-line tool for building TCP client-server applications. It consists of super-server tcpserver and tcpclient application.

From "Life with qmail", Dave Sill, 2 January 2006 (Appendix B.3.): ucspi-tcp is an acronym for UNIX Client-Server Program Interface for TCP, and it is pronounced ooks-pie tee see pee.

tcpserver features built-in TCP Wrapper-like access control.

== ucspi-tcp competes with several other programs ==
- mconnect client supplied as part of SunOS
- faucet and hose, part of the netpipes package
- netcat
