= Service wrapper =

Software to manage background services

A service wrapper is a computer program that wraps arbitrary programs thus enabling them to be installed and run as Windows Services or Unix daemons, programs that run in the background, rather than under the direct control of a user. They are often automatically started at boot time. Arbitrary programs cannot run as services or daemons, unless they fulfil specific requirements which depend on the operating system. They also have to be installed in order for the operating system to identify them as such.

Various projects exist offering a Java service wrapper, as Java itself doesn't support creating system services. Some wrappers may add additional functionality to monitor the health of the application or to communicate with it.

== See also ==
- Windows Service
- Unix daemon
