= Internet Open Trading Protocol =

System-independent protocol for electronic commerce

The Internet Open Trading Protocol (IOTP) is a system-independent protocol that provides an interoperable and standardized payment framework for electronic commerce, which tries to replicate real-world trading processes as closely as possible.

IOTP systems can include a variety of different payment systems including digital cash, electronic checks, and debit cards. Various payment transaction data are encapsulated within specific IOTP messages (customer, merchant, credit checker, certifier, bank and delivery handler).
