= ZNC-FM =

Classical music radio station in Nassau, Bahamas

- Nassau; Bahamas
- Broadcast area: New Providence, Bahamas
- Frequency: 98.1 MHz
- Branding: Classical 98.1 FM

Programming
- Language: English
- Format: Classical music

History
- Call sign meaning: ZN (former ITU prefix under United Kingdom rule) Classical FM

Technical information
- ERP: 1,000 watts
- HAAT: 35 metres (115 ft)
- Transmitter coordinates: 25°2′44″N 77°19′5″W

Links
- Webcast: http://listen.streamon.fm/classical981?autoplay=1

ZNC-FM is a classical music radio station in Nassau, Bahamas transmitting on 98.1 MHz.
