= Windows service =

Component of the Microsoft Windows operating system

In Windows NT operating systems, a Windows service is a computer program that operates in the background. It is similar in concept to a Unix daemon. A Windows service must conform to the interface rules and protocols of the Service Control Manager, the component responsible for managing Windows services. It is the Services and Controller app, services.exe, that launches all the services and manages their actions, such as start, end, etc.

Windows services can be configured to start when the operating system is started and run in the background as long as Windows is running. Alternatively, they can be started manually or by an event. Windows NT operating systems include numerous services which run in context of three user accounts: System, Network Service and Local Service. These Windows components are often associated with Host Process for Windows Services. Because Windows services operate in the context of their own dedicated user accounts, they can operate when a user is not logged on.

Prior to Windows Vista, services installed as an "interactive service" could interact with Windows desktop and show a graphical user interface. In Windows Vista, however, interactive services are deprecated and may not operate properly, as a result of Windows Service hardening.

== Administration ==
Windows administrators can manage services via:

- The Services snap-in (found under Administrative Tools in Windows Control Panel)
- Sc.exe
- Windows PowerShell

=== Services snap-in ===
The Services snap-in, built upon Microsoft Management Console, can connect to the local computer or a remote computer on the network, enabling users to:

- view a list of installed services along with service name, descriptions and configuration
- start, stop, pause or restart services
- specify service parameters when applicable
- change the startup type. Acceptable startup types include:
  - Automatic: The service starts at system startup.
  - Automatic (Delayed): The service starts a short while after the system has finished starting up. This option was introduced in Windows Vista in an attempt to reduce the boot-to-desktop time. However, not all services support delayed start.
  - Manual: The service starts only when explicitly summoned.
  - Disabled: The service is disabled. It will not run.
- change the user account context in which the service operates
- configure recovery actions that should be taken if a service fails
- inspect service dependencies, discovering which services or device drivers depend on a given service or upon which services or device drivers a given service depends
- export the list of services as a text file or as a CSV file

=== Command line ===
sc
- Developer(s): Microsoft, ReactOS Contributors
- Operating system: Windows, ReactOS
- Type: Command
- License: Windows: Proprietary commercial software ReactOS: GNU General Public License
- Website: docs.microsoft.com/en-us/previous-versions/windows/it-pro/windows-server-2012-R2-and-2012/cc754599(v%3dws.11)

The command-line tool to manage Windows services is sc.exe. It is available for all versions of Windows NT. This utility is included with Windows XP and later and also in ReactOS.

The sc command's scope of management is restricted to the local computer. However, starting with Windows Server 2003, not only can sc do all that the Services snap-in does, but it can also install and uninstall services.

The sc command duplicates some features of the net command.

The ReactOS version was developed by Ged Murphy and is licensed under the GPL.

sc sub-commands
Name	Description	Windows support	ReactOS support
query	Show service status	Yes	Yes
queryex	Show extended service info (e.g. pid, flags)	Yes	Yes
start	Start a service	Yes	Yes
pause	Pause a service	Yes	Yes
interrogate	Send an INTERROGATE control request to a service	Yes	Yes
continue	Continue a service	Yes	Yes
stop	Stop a service	Yes	Yes
config	permanently change the service configuration	Yes	Yes
description	Change a service description	Yes	Yes
failure	Change the actions taken by a service upon failure	Yes	Yes
failureflag		Yes	No
sidtype		Yes	No
privs		Yes	No
managedaccount		Yes	No
qc	Show the service config (e.g. dependencies, full path etc.)	Yes	Yes
qdescription	Query a service description	Yes	Yes
qfailure		Yes	No
qfailureflag		Yes	No
qsidtype		Yes	No
qprivs		Yes	No
qtriggerinfo		Yes	No
qpreferrednode		Yes	No
qmanagedaccount		Yes	No
qprotection		Yes	No
quserservice		Yes	No
delete	Delete a service	Yes	Yes
create	Create a service	Yes	Yes
control	Send a control to a service	Yes	Yes
sdshow	Display a service's security descriptor using SDDL	Yes	Yes
sdset	Sets a service's security descriptor using SDDL	Yes	Yes
showsid		Yes	No
triggerinfo		Yes	No
preferrednode		Yes	No
GetDisplayName	Show the service DisplayName	Yes	Yes
GetKeyName	Show the service ServiceKeyName	Yes	Yes
EnumDepend	Show the service Dependencies	Yes	Yes
boot		Yes	No
Lock		Yes	No
QueryLock		Yes	No

==== Examples ====
The following example enumerates the status for active services & drivers.

C:\>sc query

The following example displays the status for the Windows Event log service.

C:\>sc query eventlog

=== PowerShell ===
The Microsoft.PowerShell.Management PowerShell module (included with Windows) has several cmdlets which can be used to manage Windows services:

- Get-Service
- New-Service
- Restart-Service
- Resume-Service
- Set-Service
- Start-Service
- Stop-Service
- Suspend-Service

=== Other management tools ===
Windows also includes components that can do a subset of what the snap-in, Sc.exe and PowerShell do. The net command can start, stop, pause or resume a Windows service. In Windows Vista and later, Windows Task Manager can show a list of installed services and start or stop them. MSConfig can enable or disable (see startup type description above) Windows services.

== Installation ==
Windows services are installed and removed via *.INF setup scripts by SetupAPI; an installed service can be started immediately following its installation, and a running service can be stopped before its deinstallation.

== Development ==
=== Writing native services ===
For a program to run as a Windows service, the program needs to be written to handle service start, stop, and pause messages from the Service Control Manager (SCM) through the System Services API. SCM is the Windows component responsible for managing service processes.

=== Wrapping applications as a service ===
The Windows Resource Kit for Windows NT 3.51, Windows NT 4.0 and Windows 2000 provides tools to control the use and registration of services: SrvAny.exe acts as a service wrapper to handle the interface expected of a service (e.g. handle service_start and respond sometime later with service_started or service_failed) and allow any executable or script to be configured as a service. Sc.exe allows new services to be installed, started, stopped and uninstalled.

== See also ==
Windows services

- List of Microsoft Windows components § Services
- Windows Service Hardening
- svchost.exe

Concept

- Background process
  - Daemon (computing)
  - DOS Protected Mode Services
  - Terminate-and-stay-resident program
  - Device driver
- Operating system service management
  - Service Control Manager
  - Service Management Facility
- Service wrapper
