= QOTD =

Internet protocol that provides the quote of the day

The Quote of the Day (QOTD) service is a member of the Internet protocol suite, defined in 1983 in RFC 865 by Jon Postel. As indicated there, the QOTD concept predated the specification, when QOTD was used by mainframe sysadmins to broadcast a daily quote on request by a user. It was then formally codified both for prior purposes as well as for testing and measurement purposes.

A host may connect to a server that supports the QOTD protocol, on either TCP or UDP port 17. To keep the quotes at a reasonable length, RFC 865 specifies a maximum of 512 octets for the quote.

The QOTD service is rarely enabled and is often firewalled to avoid denial-of-service attacks.

Current testing and measurement of IP networks is more commonly done with ping and traceroute, which are more robust adaptations of the echo protocol (RFC 862), which predated the attempt at QOTD standardization.
