= Request for Comments =

Publication of the development and standards for the Internet

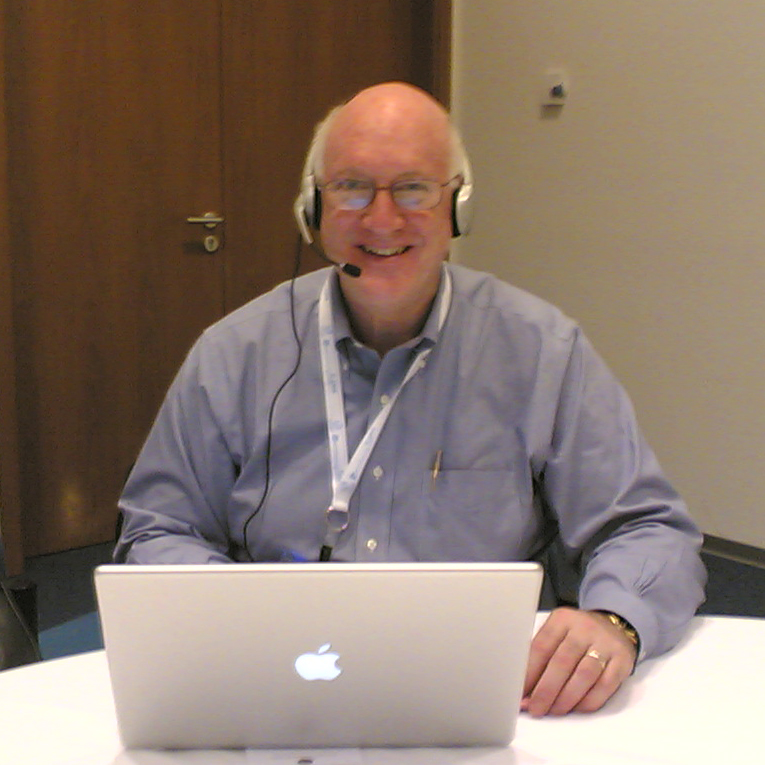
Steve Crocker, the author of several Request for Comments documents, including the very first RFC.

A Request for Comments (RFC) is a publication in a series from the principal technical development and standards-setting bodies for the Internet, most prominently the Internet Engineering Task Force (IETF). An RFC is authored by individuals or groups of engineers and computer scientists in the form of a memorandum describing methods, behaviors, research, or innovations applicable to the working of the Internet and Internet-connected systems. It is submitted either for peer review or to convey new concepts, information, or, occasionally, engineering humor.

The IETF adopts some of the proposals published as RFCs as Internet Standards. However, many RFCs are informational or experimental in nature and are not standards. The RFC system was invented by Steve Crocker in 1969 to help record unofficial notes on the development of ARPANET. RFCs have since become official documents of Internet specifications, communications protocols, procedures, and events. According to Crocker, the documents "shape the Internet's inner workings and have played a significant role in its success," but are not widely known outside the community.

Outside of the Internet community, other documents also called requests for comments have been published, as in U.S. Federal government work, such as the National Highway Traffic Safety Administration, as well as various other places such as Rust and RedoxOS.

== History ==
The inception of the RFC format occurred in 1969 as part of the seminal ARPANET project. Today, it is the official publication channel for the Internet Engineering Task Force (IETF), the Internet Architecture Board (IAB), and – to some extent – the global community of computer network researchers in general.

The authors of the first RFCs typewrote their work and circulated hard copies among the ARPA researchers. Unlike the modern RFCs, many of the early RFCs were actual Requests for Comments and were titled as such to avoid sounding too declarative and to encourage discussion. The RFC leaves questions open and is written in a less formal style. This less formal style is now typical of Internet Draft documents, the precursor step before being approved as an RFC.

In December 1969, researchers began distributing new RFCs via the newly operational ARPANET. RFC 1, titled "Host Software", was written by Steve Crocker of the University of California, Los Angeles (UCLA), and published on April 7, 1969. Although written by Steve Crocker, the RFC had emerged from an early working group discussion between Steve Crocker, Steve Carr, and Jeff Rulifson.

In RFC 3, which first defined the RFC series, Crocker started attributing the RFC series to the Network Working Group. Rather than being a formal committee, it was a loose association of researchers interested in the ARPANET project. In effect, it included anyone who wanted to join the meetings and discussions about the project.

Many of the subsequent RFCs of the 1970s also came from UCLA, because UCLA had one of the first Interface Message Processors (IMPs) on ARPANET. The Augmentation Research Center (ARC) at Stanford Research Institute, directed by Douglas Engelbart, is another of the first four ARPANET nodes and the source of early RFCs. The ARC became the first network information center (InterNIC), which was managed by Elizabeth J. Feinler to distribute the RFCs along with other network information.

On April Fools' Day 1978, RFC 748 was published as a parody of the TCP/IP documentation style. This resumed in 1989 with the publication of RFC 1097, which describes an option for telnet clients to display subliminal messages. Subsequent April Fools' Day RFCs have been published annually since then, notably RFC 2324, which describes the Hyper Text Coffee Pot Control Protocol and defines the HTTP 418 "I'm a teapot" status. Humorous RFCs date back to RFC 439, published in January 1973.

=== RFC Editor function ===
From 1969 until 1998, Jon Postel served as the RFC editor. On his death in 1998, his obituary was published as RFC 2468.

Following the expiration of the original ARPANET contract with the U.S. federal government, the Internet Society, acting on behalf of the IETF, contracted with the Networking Division of the University of Southern California (USC) Information Sciences Institute (ISI) to assume the editorship and publishing responsibilities under the direction of the IAB. Sandy Ginoza joined USC/ISI in 1999 to work on RFC editing, and Alice Hagens in 2005. Bob Braden took over the role of RFC project lead, while Joyce K. Reynolds continued to be part of the team until October 13, 2006.

In July 2007, streams of RFCs were defined so that the editing duties could be divided. IETF documents came from IETF working groups or submissions sponsored by an IETF area director from the Internet Engineering Steering Group. The IAB can publish its own documents. A research stream of documents comes from the Internet Research Task Force (IRTF), and an independent stream from other outside sources. A new model was proposed in 2008, refined, and published in August 2009, splitting the task into several roles, including the RFC Series Advisory Group (RSAG). The model was updated in 2012,, and 2020. The streams were also refined in December 2009, with standards defined for their style. In January 2010, the RFC Editor function was moved to a contractor, Association Management Solutions, with Glenn Kowack serving as interim series editor. In late 2011, Heather Flanagan was hired as the permanent RFC Series Editor (RSE). Also at that time, an RFC Series Oversight Committee (RSOC) was created.

In 2020, the IAB convened the RFC Editor Future Development program to discuss potential changes to the RFC Editor model. The results of the program were included the RFC Editor Model (Version 3) as defined in RFC 9280, published in June 2022. Generally, the new model is intended to clarify responsibilities and processes for defining and implementing policies related to the RFC series and the RFC Editor function. Changes in the new model included establishing the position of the RFC Consulting Editor, the RFC Series Working Group (RSWG), and the RFC Series Approval Board (RSAB). It also established a new Editorial Stream for the RFC Series and concluded the RSOC. The role of the RSE was changed to the RFC Series Consulting Editor (RSCE). In September 2022, Alexis Rossi was appointed to that position.

=== New publishing format ===
Requests for Comments were originally produced in non-reflowable text format. In August 2019, the format was changed so that new documents can be viewed optimally in devices with varying display sizes.

== Production and versioning ==
The RFC Editor assigns each RFC a serial number. Once assigned a number and published, an RFC is never rescinded or modified; if the document requires amendments, the authors publish a revised document. Therefore, some RFCs supersede others; the superseded RFCs are said to be deprecated, obsolete, or obsoleted by the superseding RFC. Together, the serialized RFCs compose a continuous historical record of the evolution of Internet standards and practices. The RFC process is documented in RFC 2026 (The Internet Standards Process, Revision 3).

The RFC production process differs from the standardization process of formal standards organizations such as International Organization for Standardization (ISO). Internet technology experts may submit an Internet Draft without support from an external institution. Standards-track RFCs are published with approval from the IETF, and are usually produced by experts participating in IETF Working Groups, which first publish an Internet Draft. This approach facilitates initial rounds of peer review before documents mature into RFCs.

The RFC tradition of pragmatic, experience-driven, after-the-fact standards authorship accomplished by individuals or small working groups can have important advantages over the more formal, committee-driven process typical of ISO and national standards bodies.

Most RFCs use a common set of terms such as "MUST" and "NOT RECOMMENDED" (as defined by RFC 2119 and 8174), augmented Backus–Naur form (ABNF) (RFC 5234) as a meta-language, and simple text-based formatting, in order to keep the RFCs consistent and easy to understand.

=== Sub-series ===
The RFC series contains three sub-series for IETF RFCs: BCP, FYI, and STD. Best Current Practice (BCP) is a sub-series of mandatory IETF RFCs not on standards track. For Your Information (FYI) is a sub-series of informational RFCs promoted by the IETF as specified in RFC 1150 (FYI 1). In 2011, RFC 6360 obsoleted FYI 1 and concluded this sub-series. Standard (STD) used to be the third and highest maturity level of the IETF standards track specified in RFC 2026 (BCP 9). In 2011 RFC 6410 (a new part of BCP 9) reduced the standards track to two maturity levels.

=== Streams ===
There are five streams of RFCs: IETF, IRTF, IAB, independent submission, and Editorial. Only the IETF creates BCPs and RFCs on the standards track. The IAB publishes informational documents relating to policy or architecture. The IRTF publishes the results of research, either as informational documents or as experiments. Independent submissions are published at the discretion of the Independent Submissions Editor. Non-IETF documents are reviewed by the IESG for conflicts with IETF work. IRTF and independent RFCs generally contain relevant information or experiments for the Internet at large not in conflict with IETF work. compare RFC 4846, 5742 and 5744. The Editorial Stream is used to effect editorial policy changes across the RFC series (see RFC 9280).

== Obtaining RFCs ==
RFC 2046, which defines the text/plain MIME type, is itself a plain text.

RFC 2046 Media Types November 1996


 A. Collected Grammar .................................... 43

1. Introduction

 The first document in this set, RFC 2045, defines a number of header
 fields, including Content-Type. The Content-Type field is used to
 specify the nature of the data in the body of a MIME entity, by
 giving media type and subtype identifiers, and by providing auxiliary
 information that may be required for certain media types. After the

The official source for RFCs on the World Wide Web is the RFC Datatracker. Almost any published RFC can be retrieved via a URL of the form https://datatracker.ietf.org/doc/html/rfc5000, shown for RFC 5000.

Every RFC is submitted as plain ASCII text and is published in that form, but may also be available in other formats.

For easy access to the metadata of an RFC, including abstract, keywords, author(s), publication date, errata, status, and especially later updates, the RFC Editor site offers a search form with many features. A redirection sets some efficient parameters, example: rfc:5000.

The official International Standard Serial Number (ISSN) of the RFC series is 2070-1721.

== Status ==
Not all RFCs are standards. Each RFC is assigned a designation with regard to status within the Internet standardization process. This status is one of the following: Informational, Experimental, Best Current Practice, Standards Track, or Historic.

Once submitted, accepted, and published, an RFC cannot be changed. Errata may be submitted, which are published separately. More significant changes require a new submission which will receive a new serial number.

=== Standards Track ===
Standards track documents are further divided into Proposed Standard and Internet Standard documents.

Only the IETF, represented by the Internet Engineering Steering Group (IESG), can approve standards-track RFCs.

If an RFC becomes an Internet Standard (STD), it is assigned an STD number but retains its RFC number. The definitive list of Internet Standards is the Official Internet Protocol Standards. Previously STD 1 used to maintain a snapshot of the list.

When an Internet Standard is updated, its STD number stays the same, now referring to a new RFC or set of RFCs. A given Internet Standard, STD n, may be RFCs x and y at a given time, but later the same standard may be updated to be RFC z instead. For example, in 2007 RFC 3700 was an Internet Standard—STD 1—and in May 2008 it was replaced with RFC 5000, so RFC 3700 changed to Historic, RFC 5000 became an Internet Standard, and as of May 2008 STD 1 is RFC 5000. As of December 2013 RFC 5000 is replaced by RFC 7100, updating RFC 2026 to no longer use STD 1.

(Best Current Practices work in a similar fashion; BCP n refers to a certain RFC or set of RFCs, but which RFC or RFCs may change over time).

=== Informational ===
An informational RFC can be nearly anything from April 1 jokes to widely recognized essential RFCs like Domain Name System Structure and Delegation (RFC 1591). Some informational RFCs formed the FYI sub-series.

=== Experimental ===
An experimental RFC can be an IETF document or an individual submission to the RFC Editor. A draft is designated experimental if it is unclear the proposal will work as intended or unclear if the proposal will be widely adopted. An experimental RFC may be promoted to standards track if it becomes popular and works well.

=== Best Current Practice ===
The Best Current Practice subseries collects administrative documents and other texts which are considered as official rules and not only informational, but which do not affect over the wire data. The border between standards track and BCP is often unclear. If a document only affects the Internet Standards Process, like BCP 9, or IETF administration, it is clearly a BCP. If it only defines rules and regulations for Internet Assigned Numbers Authority (IANA) registries it is less clear; most of these documents are BCPs, but some are on the standards track.

The BCP series also covers technical recommendations for how to practice Internet standards; for instance, the recommendation to use source filtering to make DoS attacks more difficult (RFC 2827: "Network Ingress Filtering: Defeating Denial of Service Attacks which employ IP Source Address Spoofing") is BCP 38.

=== Historic ===
A historic RFC is one that the technology defined by the RFC is no longer recommended for use, which differs from "Obsoletes" header in a replacement RFC. For example, RFC 821 (SMTP) itself is obsoleted by various newer RFCs, but SMTP itself is still "current technology", so it is not in "Historic" status. However, since BGP version 4 has entirely superseded earlier BGP versions, the RFCs describing those earlier versions, such as RFC 1267, have been designated historic.

=== Unknown ===
Status unknown is used for some very old RFCs, where it is unclear which status the document would get if it were published today. Some of these RFCs would not be published at all today; an early RFC was often just that: a simple Request for Comments, not intended to specify a protocol, administrative procedure, or anything else for which the RFC series is used today.

== Copyright ==
The general rule is that original authors (or their employers, if their employment conditions so stipulate) retain copyright unless they make an explicit transfer of their rights.

An independent body, the IETF Trust, holds the copyright for some RFCs and for all others it is granted a license by the authors that allows it to reproduce RFCs. The Internet Society is referenced on many RFCs prior to RFC4714 as the copyright owner, but it transferred its rights to the IETF Trust.

== See also ==
- Best current practice
- Internet Experiment Note
- List of RFCs
