= Grace Oluchi Mbah =

Climate change activist

- Born: 22 January 1994 (age 32)
- Years active: 2021–present
- Organisation: Climate Action Africa
- Known for: Climate change activism

Grace Oluchi Mbah (born 22 January 1994) is a climate change activist.

She co-founded the Climate Action Africa (CAA) on 14 July 2021, with Chukwuemeka Fred Agbata. It is a non-government and non-profit organisation that focuses on addressing the climate issues in Africa.

== Education and early life ==
Grace has a B.Sc. in Banking and Finance. She also has an MBA in Business Management.

== Activities ==
Grace's career in activism on climate change stemmed from the effects of loss, destruction of life and property, damage to agricultural products and the issues of the waste of resources due to global warming in Nigeria. Even though, climate change is a natural phenomenon, Grace and her team carry out sensitization and advocacy and build partnerships with the indication that not attending to climate change will have a resultant effect on health, agriculture, environment, economy, society and all aspects of human endeavour. According to Grace, “Nigeria’s vulnerability to climate change necessitates immediate and collective action. Through this partnership, we aspire to harness the power of innovation, sustainable practices, policy dialogue, and community engagement to reshape Nigeria’s future and set a global example.” They develop ideation and provide facilities on climate change.

They launched Climate Action Africa Labs (CAA Labs) which created an innovation that supports the development of the climate-tech startup ecosystem in Africa. Collaborating with the government, researchers, scientists, and experts, the CAA Labs addressed the changing climate issues, and evidence-based policy decisions on the continent support the translation of research discoveries as well as climate-tech organisations and startups in developing sustainable solutions.

Grace with her team under Climate Action Africa established and launched Climate Stories 4 Kids. This is focused on educating and nurturing children and young adults to be aware of climate change and to begin early to protect their communities. It is a “catch them young ”initiative with audio-visual and digital viewing content. The project targets one million young minds across the world with designed fiction on climate change based on real-life settings. According to the Director, “Our children are the future stewards of this planet. When we make climate education exciting and accessible, we empower them to take charge of their environmental destiny and become advocates for change. That is exactly what we are doing.” The Climate Stories 4 Kids series is meant to be aired on radio and TV stations. The idea of children and young adults knowing climate change rhymes with the UNICEF concern that children are affected by access to water, health, education, food security and well-being. The essence is that climate change can be mitigated if safety and knowledge are enhanced.

Again, the report by the African Child Forum stated that “almost 1 billion children – nearly half of the world’s children – live in countries that are at extremely high risk of climate change impacts. Climate change has direct and indirect impacts on children’s rights to health, life, dignity and education. Also, climate change increases the risk of exposure to violence against children. Climate-induced disasters displace people, and limit access to schools, adequate water, and nutrition.” Hence effective direction towards climate change with children will probably have a good effect on controlling the ecosystem.

Grace participated in the Africa Climate Summit in Kenya focused on tackling climate issues in Africa, from 4 to 6 September 2023 at the Kenyatta International Convention Centre (KICC) in Nairobi, Kenya. This summit was attended by other climate activists, government personnel and other stakeholders. The Africa Climate Summit of 2023 provided a platform for policymakers, practitioners, businesses and civil society that caused interactions on climate solutions, challenges and strategies as well as opportunities achieved in different regions. This led to the first global stocktaking that was concluded at the COP28 in UAE in December 2023. Grace signed a memorandum of associations (MoU), collaborated and participated in climate change events for creating a friendly environment in Nigeria in 2024 in Abuja.

In March 2024, Climate Action Africa under the leadership of Grace Mbah announced its programme Climate Action Africa Forum 2024 (CAAF24) with the theme “Green Economies, Brighter Futures: Innovating and Investing in Africa’s Climate-Smart Development.” She stated, “It’s no news that the world stands at a critical juncture, where decisive action is imperative to mitigate the adverse impacts of climate change." The rainy season in Nigeria seems to have been doubled with heavy downpour. It becomes imperative that spaces are created for organisations, governments, individuals, and volunteers to effectively deliberate and take decisive steps in saving our planet from harsh climate conditions. Climate change in Nigeria is critical as the nation has witnessed damages across the states, hence the need for collaboration with other stakeholders outside the government to sustain the country with lasting results that will restore the environment.

In June 2024 when the actual Climate Action Africa Forum (CAAF24) took place at Landmark Event Centre, Lagos, Nigeria, Grace participated with the opening remark on strategizing for more enriched outputs on climate mitigation. She and her group established the Deal Room at the conference to connect high-impact climate innovators in Africa with potential investors for accelerating sustainable solutions. It is a new innovation platform on climate change mitigation and the launching of planting of one billion trees.

== Achievement ==
Grace co-established Climate Action Africa, an organisation for strategising resilience for climate change in July 2021.

Grace with her Team launched Climate Action Africa Labs (CMA Labs) to develop and support the climate-tech startup ecosystem in Africa.

Her team established climate stories for kids in 2023.

She signed the memorandum of association (MoU) with the National Council on Climate Change (NCCC) on tackling the challenges of climate change in Nigeria in February 2024.

She participated in the Africa Climate Summit in Kenya on solving issues of climate in Africa in 2023.

She, with her group, planned the Climate Action Africa Forum 2024 (CAAF24) for greater impacts on climate change in March 2024.

Convened Climate Action Forum (CAAF24) at Lagos in June, 2024.
