= Chinwe Okoli =

Nigerian public policy expert and analyst

- Citizenship: Nigeria
- Education: B.Sc. in Economics and M.Sc. in Public Policy and Management
- Alma mater: University of Nigeria Nsukka and University of London
- Occupations: Special adviser to the Governor on Innovation and Business Incubation
- Employer: Anambra State Government
- Known for: Public Policy Expertise and analysis
- Notable work: A Daunting Odyssey and The Ladder to Academic Excellence
- Title: Ms.
- Awards: Upcoming Anambra State Female Achiever

Chinwe Okoli is a Nigerian Public Policy Expert and Analyst. She is a Special Adviser to the Governor of Anambra State, Professor Charles Soludo on Innovation and Business Incubation. She was appointed the second time under the second tenure of Governor Charles Soludo as the Special Adviser, Innovation and Business Incubation & CEO, Solution Innovation District in March, 2026. The reappointments were confirmed and signed by the Chief Press Secretary of Anambra State Government, Christian Aburime, on March 23, 2026, after an official statement.

== Early life and education ==
Chinwe went to University of Nigeria, Nsukka and has a B.Sc. in Economics. She did her M.Sc. in Public Policy and Management from the University of London. She also has a Diploma in Management of Higher Education Institutes from Galilee International Management Institute (GIMI), Israel.

== Career ==
Ms Okoli was the Manager of the first university-embedded innovation hub in Nigeria which is located at University of Nigeria, Nsukka. While she was there, she partook with the co-designed, and implemented of the business structure, curriculum, as well as the full startup incubation programme.

It should be remembered that under the civil service, Chinwe Okoli was first appointed as the Special Adviser to the Governor on Innovation and Business Incubation in 2023. Her appointment letter was signed the then Commissioner for Information of Anambra State, Mr Paul Nwosu. According to Qualitative Magazine, "Chinwe Okoli's appointment on Innovation and Business Incubation alongside her role as Chief executive officer of Solution Innovation District signals a forward-thinking approach to governance - one that recognizes the critical role of innovation, technology and youth-driven enterprise in shaping the future."

=== Activities ===
Chinwe participated and spoke at the OACPS Ministerial Forums, The OACPS Business Summit, The World Business Angel Investment Forum (WBAF), The International Association of Science Parks (IASP) World Conference in Europe and Middle East and also at the African Caribbean and Pacific (ACP) Business Summit. She was at the Startup Summit by Facebook; F8 2019 at the Silicon Valley, USA. She served as a Guest speaker on innovation and entrepreneurship in Nigeria, France, United Kingdom, Ethiopia, Senegal and Kenya.

She has represented Nigeria in international fora in the United States, United Kingdom, Sweden and France. Chinwe was the key note speaker and on a Panel Discussions, on a National Certification, Networking Opportunities, and internships at The Nigeria Association of Computing Students (NACOS NATIONAL) Convention! The convention took place from July 23 to 25, 2024.

In 2023, Ms Chinwe Okoli attended the 40th IASP World Conference on Science Parks and Areas of Innovation took place at the European Convention Centre, Luxembourg. While addressing the delegates on global innovation ecosystem, she stated, "we want Anambra to be known as a destination for innovation, the next Startup State, home for digital Talents, the home of the smart digital tribe." The theme of the conference was "Megatrends in Innovation Ecosystems: What are the impacts for STPs and AOIs?" Leaders from over 55 countries attended the convention.

Chinwe was at the one-day Strategic Stakeholders Meeting of the Association of Telecoms Companies of Nigeria (ATCON) in Abuja with the MD/CEO of Anambra State ICT Agency, Chukwuemeka Fred Agbata. They represented Anambra State and stated that, "Anambra State has already established a robust framework for engagement. They noted that the state has clear policies in place to enhance the ease of doing business, and it is now up to the operators to leverage these opportunities."

At the 5th International Conference and Exhibition for Science, Technology, Innovation, and Entrepreneurship (FAPSCON) in 2023, Chinwe as the key note speaker. Her speech titled, "Breaking Barriers to Innovation, Local Manufacturing and Technology Development in Nigeria, Shedding light on critical barriers to innovation and technology in Nigeria" emphasizing that "one of the major setbacks to innovation is ignorance to opportunities offered by technology and innovation."

Chinwe was in attendance at the collaboration of The United Nations Development Programme (UNDP) and Anambra state unveiling of the Makerspace to drive innovation and foster economic growth across Anambra state. At the ceremony, she stated that, “the ability to create and innovate locally is not just a matter of choice; it is essential for economic resilience and growth.”

== Publications ==
Chinwe has some publications which include:

1. A Daunting Odyssey.

2. The Ladder to Academic Excellence.

== Award ==
Chinwe was given award as the Upcoming Anambra State Female Achiever. The award was given by The Nigeria Association of Women Journalists (NAWOJ), Anambra State Chapter on July 30, 2026.
