= Climate Action Africa =

Climate resilience organization

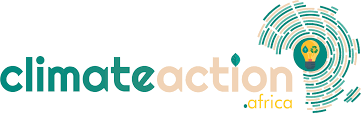
- Official logo for Climate Action Africa
- Formation: July 14, 2021
- Founded at: Lagos, Nigeria
- Key people: Chukwuemeka Fred Agbata Grace Oluchi Mbah

Climate Action Africa commonly referred to as CMA is a climate resilience organization located at GRA Ikeja, Lagos. It was founded on July 14, 2021, by Grace Oluchi Mbah and Chukwuemeka Fred Agbata. It provides a platform for climate consciousness with data resources to support policies on evidence-based climate issues in Africa. In April 2024, Climate Action Africa formerly known as CMA announced its change of acronym to CAA. This was announced in a climate workshop in Awka, Anambra State, Nigeria.

Climate Action Africa participated in the Africa Climate Summit 2023 from September 4 to 6, 2023 at the Kenyatta International Convention Centre (KICC) in Nairobi. It is a known fact that climate change affects every facet of life, thus, the UN Climate Change News of September 2023 featured the Africa Climate Week 2023 (ACW) with a focus on strategizing solutions, especially across the continent of Africa.

== History ==
Climate Action Africa officially started operations in July 2021 by Oluchi Grace and Chukwuemeka Fred Agbata at 53 Oladipo Bateye Street, G.R.A. Ikeja, Lagos as a center for accelerating innovative climate-tech startup ecosystem in Africa. Its methodology is said to be hinged on community engagement on open knowledge with free articles, reports, infographics, videos, and interactive tools. They are said to be known for offering available documents on awareness and deep knowledge of climate issues to policymakers, communities, stakeholders, individuals, and civil society organizations. The research discoveries are translated for climate-tech organizations and startups for effective use in sustainable climate solutions. Their emphases are known to be on clean energy, sustainable agriculture, and eco-friendly technologies.

Climate Action Africa happens to be one of the climate-tech innovation hubs in Africa and has localized its solution to spotlight over 50 innovators that drive climate issues in African communities. CMA is known to provide free access to over 2,000 climate knowledge resources in different formats and sources. The free accurate and authentic sources are said to have impacted over 10,000 individuals.

== Climate Action Africa, Labs (CMA Labs) ==
The Climate Action Africa, Labs (CMA Labs) were created to support the climate-tech startup ecosystem in Africa, innovate on supporting communities' impacts, as well as physical and online mentoring, funding, monitoring, and follow-up. This has also generated collaborations with researchers, experts in climate issues, scientists, and the government as well as with local and international partners, reaching out to over 5,000 people whose focus on climate consciousness has been supported. Again, reports have it that "The Partech State of Tech in Africa 2022 report showed that the climate-tech sector raised $863 million in equity funding." It seems to drive the global actors in the climate sectors into enforcing positive climate sustainability in Africa.

It should be remembered that the African continent has witnessed several challenges to climate change. In Nigeria, there have been a series of flood actions from 2012. The United Nations report of 2023 on Nigeria's climate stated that "in 2022 alone, flooding killed at least 662 people, injured 3,174, displaced about 2.5 million, and destroyed 200,000 houses individuals". There have been climate effects on agriculture, the environment, businesses, and well-being of the people. Again, the reports of the Premium Times stated that 'the climate scourge affecting Africa and the world is evident in the fluctuating weather events (increased/low rainfall, flood, drought, warming oceans and increasing temperatures among others) which are disrupting food systems, and businesses and causing havoc to lives and livelihoods.

Perhaps this is the reason, the United Nations called on the governments, businesses, finance, local authorities, and civil society to respond more on climate issues for a more sustainable economy on what they call "The world is watching – and the planet can't wait." This statement is a confirmation that challenges and obstacles are weighing the climate change activities down. In other words, the call imbues all ideation, support and funds for more sustainable environment, especially in Africa.

== Climate Action Africa Forum 2024 (CAAF24) ==
The changes in the weather and the environment have opened more learning and fora on discussions, that bother the management of the planet. As many organizations and stakeholders come together to brainstorm on the best practices for saving the environment, Climate Action Africa organized a forum titled, Climate Action Africa Forum 2024 (CAAF24). This took place in Lagos from June 17th to 19th 2024 at the Landmark Event Centre, Lagos, Nigeria. The Theme of the conference was, "Green Economies, Brighter Future - Innovating and Investing in Africa's Climate-Smart Development."

To buttress the reason behind CAAF24, the Executive Director & Co-founder of Climate Action Africa Forum, Grace Oluchi Mbah stated "I stand before you today filled with a profound sense of purpose, but also a deep urgency. The very air we breathe, the land that sustains us, the future we dream for our children – all are under threat from a changing climate." There was a campaign on a tree-planting which was tagged 'Billion Trees for Africa.' It was organized to mitigate the effects of environmental factors in the society.

Some of the agencies and organizations that participated at the CAAF24 included The Nigeria Sovereign Investment Authority, The Catalyst Fund and the Africa Enterprise Challenge Fund are also supporters. The African Development Bank described it an "innovative platform connecting high-impact climate innovators in Africa with potential investors committed to accelerating sustainable solutions." Also in attendance were the government officials, business leaders, academics, civil society representatives, climate experts and the media. There were panel discussions, workshops in breakout sessions, Deal Room for building potential investors for the acceleration of climate-sustainable solutions in Africa.

== Activities of Climate Action Africa ==
In September 2023, Chukwuemeka Fred Agbata announced the participation of the CMA Team at the Africa Climate Summit 2023. This took place at the Kenyatta International Convention Centre (KICC) in Nairobi, Kenya, from September 4 and 6, 2023. The summit developed the Nairobi Declaration which addressed the challenges of climate change in Africa. World leaders, governments, and policymakers participated in the summit. At the Summit, Grace Oluchi stated, "As we embark on this journey, let us remember that our collective actions today will determine the world we leave for future generations." It becomes critical to work towards saving our planet from further damage by climate issues.

CMA has collaborated with tech organizations and hubs which include Creative Space Startups, ISN Hubs, Techbuild, AfriLabs, Founder Institute, and Growth4Her. It has also been known to do joint programs with the Nigerian Library Association (Anambra State Chapter) and Our Lady Queen of Nigeria Catholic Church.

The issue of Nigeria's climate change brought Climate Action Africa and the National Council on Climate Change (NCCC) on a collaboration to work on lasting strategies for a more globally friendly condition. The Memorandum of Understanding (MoU) of the partnership was signed at the NCC office in Abuja. One of the impacts of the collaboration disclosed that a global event on controlling climate change would take place later in 2024 with stakeholders across the world.

The need for collaboration with stakeholders on the climate action like the policy development and implementation, innovation and technology, community mobilization and education, investment and financing sectors has been called by Climate Action Africa to ensure good sustainable future. Partnering on addressing climate change is also a concern for researchers who reported that it will create more sustainable development.
