= Chukwuemeka Fred Agbata =

Nigerian technology entrepreneur and TV presenter (born 1979)

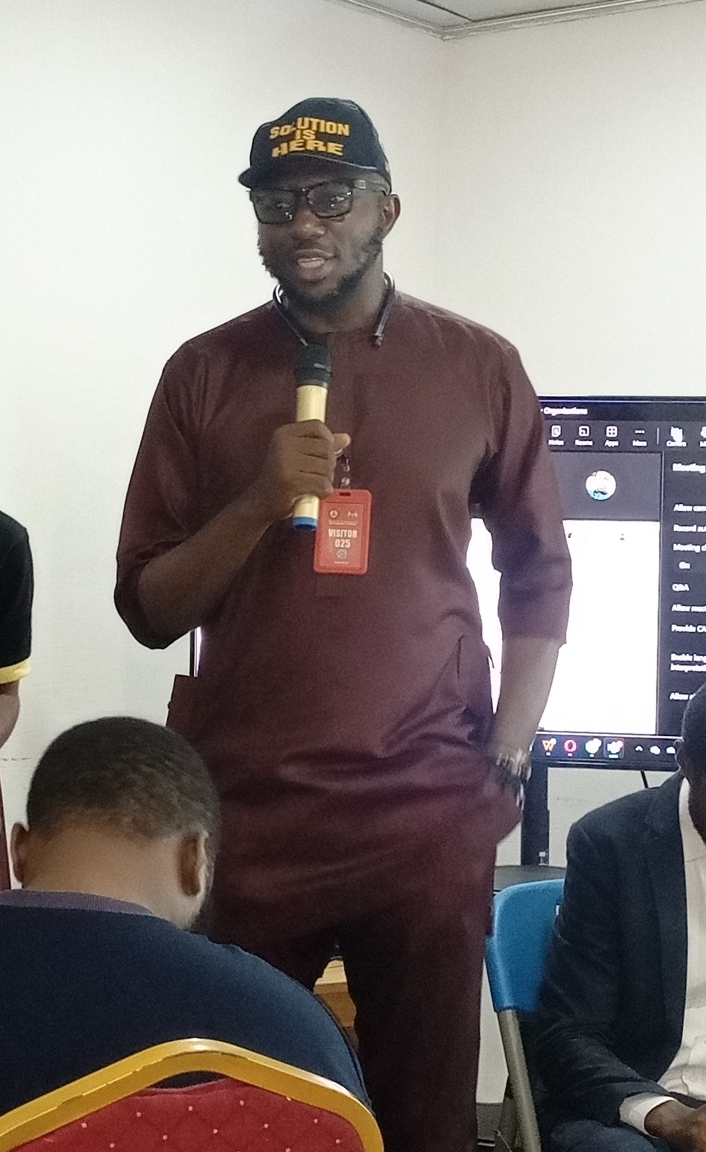
- Agbata in August 2023
- Born: 10 July 1979 (age 47)
- Education: Ekiti State University
- Presenting career
- Show: Tech Trends
- Station: Channels TV
- Time slot: Mondays 4:30 pm
- Show: Tech on Wheels with CFA
- Station: Family Love FM Port Harcourt
- Network: Family Love Radio Network
- Time slot: 5:15–5:30 pm
- Country: Nigeria

Chukwuemeka Fred Agbata Jnr. (born 10 July 1979) also known as CFA is a Nigerian journalist and a former television presenter at Channels TV. He is into digital marketing and known as a technology entrepreneur with focus on business coaching and public speaking. He hosted the first virtual telehealth conference of Nigeria’s telemedicine company, CareClick with the theme ‘The Future Of Healthcare Today’ on 24 September 2020. He was involved in various ICT-related companies that contributed to the development of the Founder Institute. He is known as the founder of Pacer Venture and has links with Climate Action Africa. He is the MD/CEO of Anambra State ICT Agency.

== Education ==
Agbata is a graduate of sociology from the Ekiti State University in Ado Ekiti, Nigeria.

== Career ==
He was a TV Presenter at the Channels TV. In 2015, he started a TV show on Channels TV titled, Tech Trends which was aired on Fridays at 6:30 pm (GMT +1). The show focused on capturing and sharing the latest technology trends, productivity tools, mobiles & PC apps, as well as timely information that will help the viewers become tech-savvy to be able to use technology more productively. He was also a columnist for The Punch called ICT Clinic.

In 2015, he started a radio show on the Family Love Radio Network called Tech on Wheels with CFA. It was aired on Wednesdays on many radio stations across Nigeria. These included 97.7 Love FM Port Harcourt at 5.15–5.30 p.m.; 104.5 Love FM Abuja at 6:30–6:45 p.m. and on 103.9 Love FM Umuahia at 7:30–7:45 p.m. In 2018, he co-founded GoDoHub, also known as GoDo.ng. a start-up center with facilities to help entrepreneurs leverage technology and innovation to start and run their businesses. GoDoHub was unveiled in Ikeja, the Lagos State capital, on 1 October 2018 by John Obaro of SystemSpecs Nigeria Limited.

Chukwuemeka Fred Agbata became the Director of The Founder Institute Lagos in March 2019. This training school helps startups grow through entrepreneurship training by helping curb the lack of structure, mentorship and network. In March 2019, 75 hubs across Nigeria came together to form an alliance to boost innovation and entrepreneurship. The network was named the Innovation Support Network (ISN). CFA became one of its directors.

He was a member of the 5th executive board of directors at the Nigeria Internet Registration Association (NiRA), from 2017 to April 2019. He also became a board member of the 6th executive board of directors. He was known to have established CFAtech.ng. He was the convener of the CFA's Startup Hangout, a strategic avenue for SME startups to meet and learn from successful entrepreneurs, through discourses that will assist them to grow their various startups as well as network with one another. This platform hosted entrepreneurs like John Obaro, Ommo Clark, Obi Asika. It was hosted in Lagos, Nigeria.

== Climate Action Africa ==
In 2021 after a series of climate issues in Nigeria, Chukwuemeka Fred Agbata with his co-founders Oluchi Grace and Ifeyinwa Ugochukwu founded Climate Action Africa. It is an organization that takes action to address the climate issues in Africa content. It partners with governments, civil society, businesses and individuals to strategize and innovate on sustainable development of Africa for all. It launched Climate Action Africa Labs (CMA Labs) that created an innovation that supports the development of climate-tech startup ecosystem in Africa. Collaborating with the government, researchers, scientists, and experts, the CMA Labs addressed the changing climate issues, and evidence-based policy decisions on the continent support the translation of research discoveries as well as climate-tech organizations and startups in developing sustainable solutions. From 4 to 6 September 2023, Chukwuemeka Fred Agbata and his Team participated in the Africa Climate Summit 2023 with a focus on tackling climate issues in Africa. The activity that took place at the Kenyatta International Convention Centre (KICC) in Nairobi, Kenya attracted leaders and stakeholders in the government and developed the resolve to drive sustainable remedies in African continent.

== Pacer Venture ==
In 2009, Chukwuemeka Fred Agbata with his Team, Gbemi Akande, Antonia Norman and Geoffry Weli-Wosu co-founded Pacer Venture. The organization was established to foster digital transformation in Africa. Having been registered in Delaware, United States, which operates in Lagos, Nigeria, and Johannesburg, South Africa, it was reported that "the firm has already commenced supporting early-stage founders by participating in seed rounds, including, VPD, Money, AI (Analytics Intelligence), Farm 365, and Learn Power." In 2023, the Funder Institute announced Pacer Ventures as its "Investor in Residence" for African Accelerator program to review startups of the graduates from the Founder Institute in Africa for possible support in investment in their seed or pre-seed round of funding. Pacer Ventures has provided marketing and promotional support in collaboration with techbuild.africa for FI portfolio companies across Africa. It launched a $3 million fund with a focus on healthcare, education, finance, and agriculture. This is set to cover the African continent which transcended to the offices in Lagos and Johannesburg. The organization created Pacer Labs, a software development firm to support the digital ecosystem of Africa as well as the growth of other organizations that wish to expand their technological advances.

== Anambra State ICT Agency ==
Chukwuemeka Fred Agbata was appointed as the CEO, Anambra State Agency ICT in 2020 by Governor Chukwuma Charles Soludo . and was also reappointed in May 2026 for another term in office. The Agency is responsible for the Anambra State eGovernment initiatives with the mantra “Everything Technology and Technology Everywhere” vision. The Agency was said to have won four awards at the ICT peer review session that took place in Kano during the 11th National Council on Communication, Innovation and Digital Economy (NCCIDE) in 2024. This is in line with the mantra of "Everything Technology and Technology Everywhere." The CEO of Anambra State Agency ICT received the award on behalf of the Anambra State government. The agency's activities were also recognized by the Federal Government of Nigeria as the best in digital infrastructure technology development.

In 2024, the MD/CEO of Anambra State ICT Agency, Chukwuemeka Fred Agbata, represented the Anambra State government with Ms. Chinwe Okoli, the Special Adviser to the Governor of Anambra State on Innovation & Business Incubation, at a one-day Strategic Stakeholders Meeting of the Association of Telecoms Companies of Nigeria (ATCON) in Abuja. At the event, they noted that, "the state has clear policies in place to enhance the ease of doing business, and it is now up to the operators to leverage these opportunities."

== Special recognitions ==
He has the following recognitions:

- A member of the Anambra State delegation to US government that hosted the high technologies partners meeting for technology collaboration and innovation at the US Consulate General in Lagos State.
- Invitation as an international expert by the Swedish Institute as part of their Innovation Ecosystem Programme to meet founders and entrepreneurs for renowned startups and large companies with a focus on innovation in June 2019.
- Invitation by the Consul General of the Federal Republic of Germany, Ingo Herbert to be part of the jury for the first Falling Walls Lab Lagos which is a commemoration of the falling of the Berlin Wall in 2018.
- Media panelist at the Deutsche Welle Global Media Forum in Bonn, (Germany), where he discussed the role of journalistic start-ups in illiberal media systems in 2018.
- Panelist alongside former Nigerian Minister of Information Frank Nweke Jr., and the former Aviation Minister Osita Chidoka, at the annual Genesys Ignite Tech Conference organized by Genesys Tech Hub in Enugu. He moderated the panel session on human capital development and innovation.
- Selected as one of the judges in Nigeria by Slush Global Impact Accelerator, a program created in collaboration with the Ministry for Foreign Affairs of Finland and other multiple partners around the globe with the purpose of supporting impact startups and showcasing the exciting business opportunities in emerging markets in 2018.
- Panelist at the annual Genesys Ignite Tech Conference organized by Genesys Tech Hub in Enugu, alongside Ommo Clark of iBez Nigeria as well as Obi Asika, while Sen. Ken Nnamani (former president of the Nigerian Senate) gave the keynote speech in 2017.
- Panelist at the Nigerian Digital Marketing Summit held in Lagos in 2014.
- Committee member of the inauguration/first plenary sessions of the Anambra State Government from 19–22 January 2022 at the Golden Tulip (Agulu Lake) Hotel, Anambra State.

== Publications ==
- Technology Disruption: To Wrestle or To Unleash: An African Response to a Global Perspective and Demand for New Creative Enterprise and Innovative Technology Kindle Edition by Taiwo Fajolu and Chukwuemeka Agbata Jr. Published on 12 January 2021 by Amazon.
- Powering your Business on the Internet and Social Media – A Guide for Today’s Business Owner by Chukwuemeka Fred Agbata.
- Becoming a Professional Blogger – the Complete Step by Step Guide by Chukwuemeka Fred Agbata.
- Towards a smaller world by Chukwuemeka Fred Agbata, published on 7 December 2013 by Amazon.

== Awards ==
- Presidential Award for Youth Development by Nigeria Internet Registration Association (NIRA) in 2016.
- Award of Excellence from Nigeria's Top Executives in the IT & Software Industry in 2015.
- One of Nigeria's 100 most inventive people in technology in 2015 by YNaija
- One of the two Nigerians nominated for 2022 Global Startup Leadership Awards out of more than 35 eminent personalities nominated globally
