= Ommo Clark =

Software designer

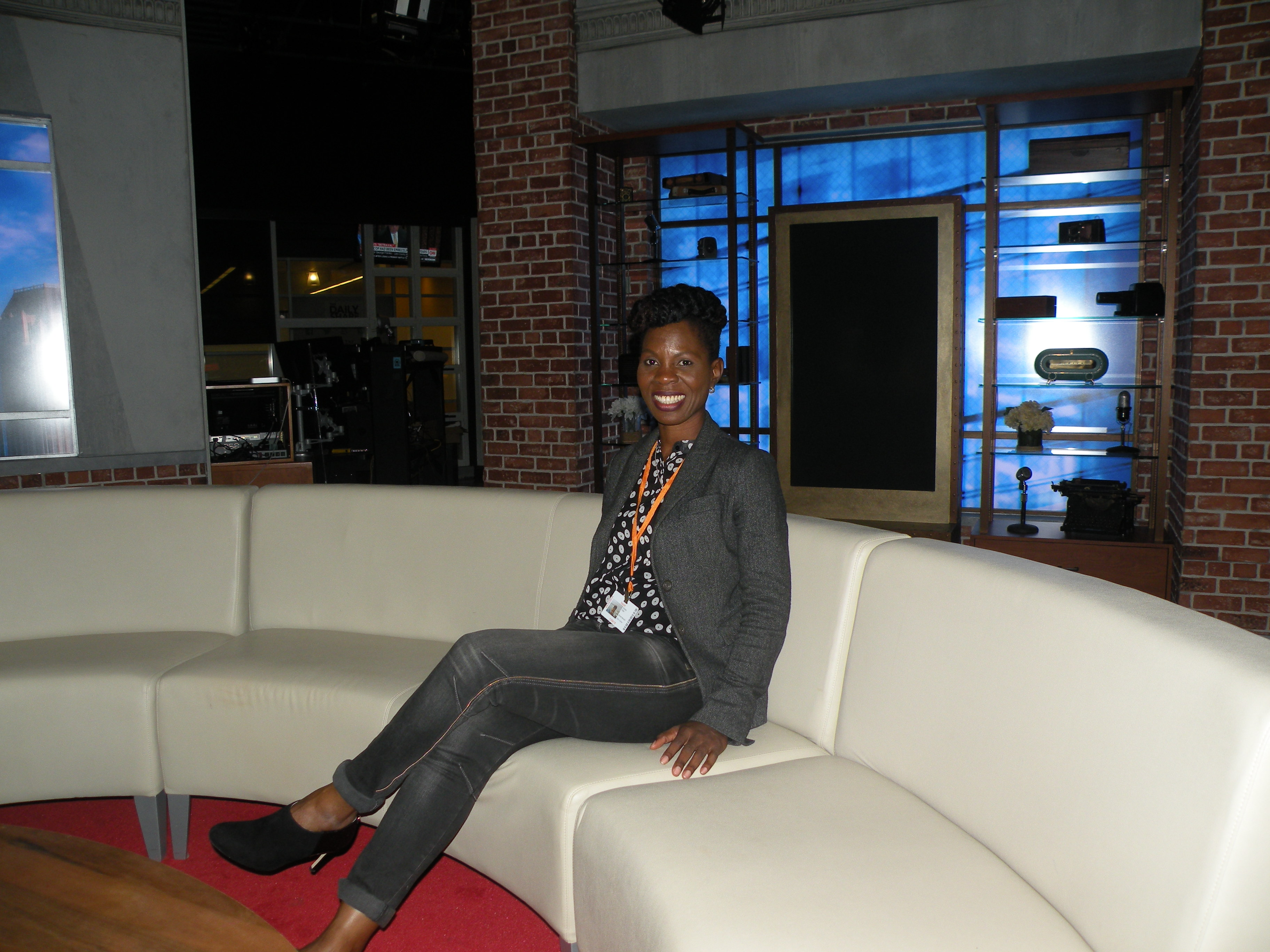
- Citizenship: Nigeria
- Education: London Guildhall University UK, BA (Hons) Business Admin; Brunel University UK, MSc Information Systems.
- Occupations: Software developer; public speaker
- Known for: Software Development
- Notable work: Founded iBez
- Website: https://www.ibez.com.ng/

Ommo Clark is a Nigerian software designer, techpreneur, public speaker, CEO and founding director of iBez Nigeria. iBez Nigeria is an indigenous technology company that caters for the needs of businesses in emerging and underserved markets by developing software applications and online platforms and also trains software developers on software development processes. IBez is the producer of Handy-jack, the platform that connects artisans and professional service provider with their seekers. She consistently shares her expertise in research and insights at prestigious conferences, where she delivers keynote speeches.

== Education ==
Clark is an alumna of London Guildhall University UK with Bachelors (Hons) in Business Administration. She also holds an MSc in Information Systems from Brunel University UK. She completed her Ph.D. in Information Systems at the University of Maryland Baltimore County. Clark successfully defended her PhD proposal on 10 June 2025.

== Career ==
Clark had a brief career in International Development after which she worked as an application support consultant with Real Asset Management UK. Several years later, she joined the investment bank, Lehman Brothers UK and worked as a team leader in the Mortgage capital division. Four years later, she joined Icelandic Investment Bank UK after leaving Lehman Brothers where she worked as an IT project manager. In 2008, she returned to Nigeria and worked with a software solutions company as head of project delivery and support. She joined International Development Company as Chief Operating Officer (COO) in 2012.

In 2013, Clark decided to start iBez Nigeria, her own indigenous technology company, to promote and showcase locally developed software applications. Products created by iBez include:

- Handy-Jacks, an online directory of maintenance and repair artisans for referencing by homeowners and businesses
- Schools Network Integrated Programme (SNIP)
- Project management information system (PMIS)
- Hotel Motel Solution
- Let's Share
- Exchange BBP

Clark started her ICT business initiatives from her laptop.

== See also ==
- Shola Akinlade
- Nkiru Balonwu
