= NACOS =

Nacos or NACOS may refer to:

- Brigitte L. Nacos (born 1936), American political scientist
- Nigeria Association of Computing Students
