= Entrepreneurship ecosystem =

System that supports the creation and growth of new ventures

An entrepreneurial ecosystem or entrepreneurship ecosystems are peculiar systems of interdependent actors and relations directly or indirectly supporting the creation and growth of new ventures.

== The ecosystem metaphor ==
"Ecosystem" refers to the elements – individuals, organizations or institutions – outside the individual entrepreneur that are conducive to, or inhibitive of, the choice of a person to become an entrepreneur, or the probabilities of his or her success following launch. Organizations and individuals representing these elements are referred to as entrepreneurship stakeholders. Stakeholders are any entity that has an interest, actually or potentially, in there being more entrepreneurship in the region. Entrepreneurship stakeholders may include government, schools, universities, private sector, family businesses, investors, banks, entrepreneurs, social leaders, research centers, military, labor representatives, students, lawyers, cooperatives, communes, multinationals, private foundations, and international aid agencies.

In order to explain or create sustainable entrepreneurship, one isolated element in the ecosystem is rarely sufficient. In regions which have extensive amounts of entrepreneurship, including Silicon Valley, Boston, New York City, and Israel, many of the ecosystem elements are strong and typically have evolved in tandem. Similarly, the formation of these ecosystems suggests that governments or societal leaders who want to foster more entrepreneurship as part of economic policy must strengthen several such elements simultaneously. However, recent research shows that government policy is often limited in what it can do to develop entrepreneurial ecosystems.

In July 2010, the Harvard Business Review published an article by Daniel Isenberg, Professor of Entrepreneurship Practice at Babson College, entitled "How to Start an Entrepreneurial Revolution." In this article, Isenberg describes the environment in which entrepreneurship tends to thrive. Drawing from examples from around the world, the article proposes that entrepreneurs are most successful when they have access to the human, financial and professional resources they need, and operate in an environment in which government policies encourage and safeguard entrepreneurs. This network is described as the entrepreneurship ecosystem.

The Babson College Entrepreneurship Ecosystem Project then categorizes this framework into these domains: policy, finance, culture, supports, human capital and markets. Much additional scholarship has reinforced this conceptualization, and Liguori and colleagues developed a measure that has been widely used nationally to assess communities from Tampa to Philadelphia to Chicago, and more.

- Policy covers government regulations and support.
- Finance domain includes the full spectrum of financial services available to entrepreneurs.
- Culture covers societal norms and success stories that help to inspire people to become entrepreneurs.
- Support domain includes non-governmental institutions, infrastructure and the professionals support such as investment bankers, technical experts and advisors.
- Markets cover entrepreneurial networks and customers.
- Human capital includes education system and the skill level of the workforce.

Several academic researchers have begun to investigate entrepreneurial ecosystems as well. Spigel suggests that ecosystems require cultural attributes (a culture of entrepreneurship and histories of successful entrepreneurship), social attributes that are accessed through social ties (worker talent, investment capital, social networks, and entrepreneurial mentors) and material attributes grounded in a specific places (government policies, universities, support services, physical infrastructure, and open local markets). Stam distinguishes between framework conditions of ecosystems (formal institutions, culture, physical infrastructure, and market demand) with systematic conditions of networks, leadership, finance, talent, knowledge, and support services.

There are several key conditions that typically define a healthy ecosystem. The ecosystem:

- is tailored around its own unique environment – it does not seek to be something it isn't, like the "next Silicon Valley"
- operates in an environment with reduced bureaucratic obstacles in which government policies support the unique needs of entrepreneurs and tolerate failed ventures
- actively encourages and invites financiers to participate in new ventures - although access to money isn't without barriers for those planning new business ventures
- is reinforced, not created from scratch, by government, academic or commercial organizations
- is relatively free from, or is able to change, the cultural biases against failure or operating a business
- promotes successes, which in turn attract new ventures
- is supported by dialogue among various of the entrepreneurship stakeholders

== Related content ==
Startup ecosystem – following the financial downturn of 2008 and the long-lasting slow growth period, there have been increasing focus towards fostering more startup company creation around the world to further target regional support efforts towards those type of companies that have higher innovation, growth and job creation potential. This has also led to an increasing focus on startup ecosystem development.

University-based entrepreneurship ecosystem – Entrepreneurship thrives in ecosystems in which multiple stakeholders play key roles. Academic institutions are central in shaping young people's attitudes, skills and behaviours. However, actors outside of the education systems play an increasingly critical role in working with formal and informal educational programmes as well as reaching out to underserved and socially excluded targets groups. This requires collaboration and multistakeholder partnerships. Entrepreneurship ecosystems commonly refer to academic programs within a university that focus on the development of student/graduate entrepreneurs and/or the commercialization of technology or intellectual property developed at the university level. However before the entrepreneurial ecosystem can bloom, the education system must embrace the idea that entrepreneurship is a core element of higher education.

Also, entrepreneurship is usually perceived as the cure-all solution for deprivation depletion. Advocates assert that it guides to job design, higher earnings, and lower deprivation prices in the towns within it happens. Others disagree that numerous entrepreneurs are generating low-capacity companies helping regional markets.

Business cluster – A business cluster is a geographic concentration of interconnected businesses, suppliers, and associated institutions in a particular field. Early research was done in this context by Benjamin Chinitz in 1961. Chinitz posed several theories, but most importantly noticed a correlation between average firm size and average growth rates within regions. In addition, Glaeser, Kerr and Ponzetto followed up this research and confirmed the relationship between smaller average firm size and higher growth rates. Chatterji, Glaeser and Kerr also noted that some of the most famous entrepreneurial clusters (Silicon Valley, Boston's Route 128 Corridor, and Research Triangle Park) were located near large research universities. Governments often look to clusters to stimulate innovation and entrepreneurship in their region. When clusters are applied to entrepreneurship, experts agree governments should not seek to create new clusters, but rather reinforce existing ones. Tony Hsieh, founder of Zappos, has begun a project to see if an entrepreneurial cluster can be created in Las Vegas.

== See also ==
- Entrepreneurship
- Startup ecosystem
- Business cluster
- Economies of agglomeration
- Collaborative innovation network
- Coworking
- Innovation system
- Venture capital
