= Spinlet =

Digital media company

Spinlet Ltd
- Available in: English
- Headquarters: Lekki, LA, {{{location_country}}}
- Area served: Sub-Saharan Africa; Worldwide
- CEO: John Ajah
- Key people: Nike Anani, Babatunde Ige, Olivia Okonji
- Industry: Music, Media, Entertainment
- Services: Music Streaming and Download, YouTube Partner Services, Telco VAS

Spinlet was a digital media company, focusing on Afro-Centric content. Spinlet’s primary service was music streaming and downloads available globally via web browsers, and the Spinlet app on iOS and Android. The Spinlet platform provided the largest music catalog of licensed African and International content from content licensers such as Content Connect Africa, Africori, Symphonic Distribution, TuneCore, La Cupla Music, Deliver My Tune, and many other indies. It allowed users to purchase, listen, share and discover music while offering integration and storage of the user's music library on their mobile device. In October 2015, the Spinlet app had been downloaded nearly 2 million times.

Spinlet has been appointed by the International Federation of the Phonographic Industry (IFPI) as Nigeria’s first ever manager for ISRCs – the International Standard Recording Code, an essential digital monitoring and revenue tracking tool. In 2014, Spinlet acquired a Nigerian Communications Commission license that will allow it to sell value added services such as caller ring back tunes and short message services in collaboration with Telcos as a means of providing more avenues for content creators/owners to get paid for their content.

== History ==
Spinlet was originally a music player developed in 2006 by two Finnish brothers, Sami Leino and Ville Leino. In 2011, the app was acquired by a group of Nigerian investors represented by Verod Capital Management led by Eric Idiahi, who became the first CEO of Spinlet. Idiahi was succeeded by Neil Schwartzman who was in office from January 2013 to February 2014. Nkiru Balonwu (previously General Counsel and Chief Operating Officer) took over as CEO. The business relaunched a Spinlet Web Platform in September 2015, providing over 1.5 million tracks; later that year the business also introduced the Spinlet Inspire. Balonwu resigned as CEO at the end of June 2016, and John Ajah became the CEO on October 31, 2016.

== Launch ==
Spinlet launched in beta in Nigeria May 2012, as the first music streaming service and digital distribution firm in Sub-Saharan Africa. It was formally launched as an official product in 2013.

== Business model ==
Spinlet operates under the freemium, model basic services are free, while additional features are offered via paid subscriptions). It makes its revenues by selling streaming subscriptions to premium users and advertising placements to third parties.

== Original Content ==
Alongside being a curator of audio content, Spinlet has recently begun generating original video content (I Go Blow, Lyrically Speaking and The Spin Deck Show), which they currently host on their YouTube channel.
