= Nkiru Balonwu =

Nigerian entrepreneur

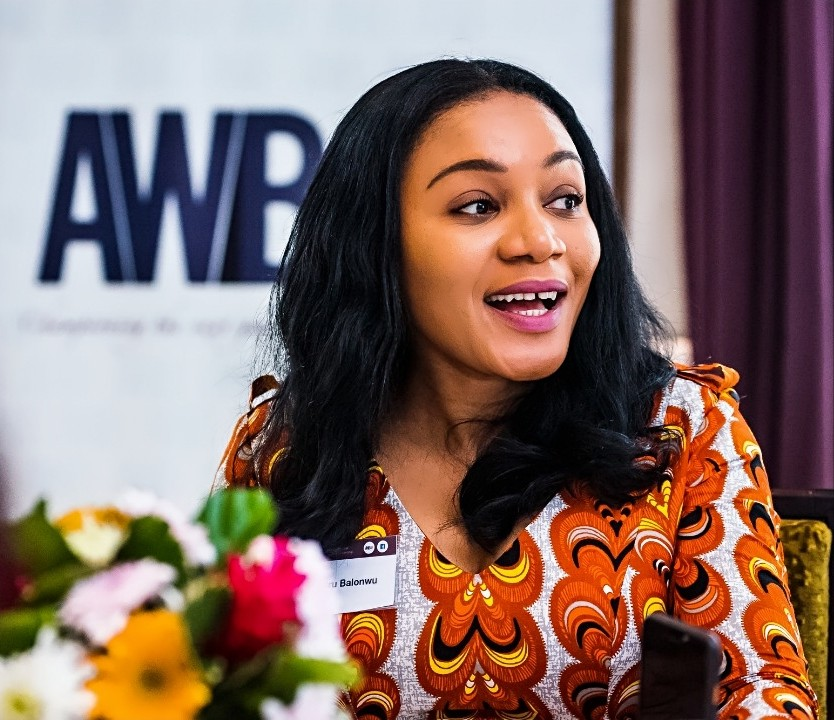
- Born: Nkiru Balonwu
- Education: Bachelor's degree - University of Manchester; Masters - University College London; Doctorate - University of California
- Occupations: Nigerian entrepreneur; US-trained communicator; Activist
- Known for: Communication expert
- Notable work: The founder and chairperson of African Women on Board
- Title: Executive director

Nkiru Balonwu is an entrepreneur and activist based in Lagos, Nigeria. She is known for her views of women as the solution to Africa's problems and is the founder and chairperson of African Women on Board, an independent, women-led African non-profit organisation focused on advancing narratives to improve realities for women and girls of African heritage. She is also founder and managing partner of RDF Strategies, a consultancy firm that provides advice on strategic communication and stakeholder engagement across sectors from law, technology, finance, advocacy, international development, show business consulting, political engineering and communications.

In 2016, during her time at the helm of Spinlet, Balonwu was featured in YNaija as one of "Nigeria's 100 Most Inspiring Women". In October 2019, Balonwu was awarded the 2020 Powerlist International Award by the Powerlist UK.

== Personal life and background ==
Balonwu is the daughter of two lawyers with a background in social change and justice. Her father was the first Senior Advocate of Nigeria (SAN) from Eastern Nigeria. She grew up in a household frequented by lawyers and judges, including those from the Court of Appeal and Supreme Court, who helped shape her understanding of the profession.

== Education ==
Balonwu graduated with a bachelor's degree in Law from the University of Manchester. She obtained her master's degree from University College London (UCL) and holds a Doctorate Degree from the University of California, Berkeley.

== Career ==
Balonwu has worked in a variety of fields including law, technology, finance, show business, international development, advocacy and communications.

She worked as a lecturer at the faculty of law, University of Lagos.

In 2014, Balonwu became CEO of Spinlet, the first music streaming and digital distribution platform in Sub-Saharan Africa. During her time as CEO, Spinlet became Nigeria's first International Standard Recording Code (ISRC) Manager.

In 2017, Balonwu founded African Women on Board which launched internationally at the Ford Foundation Center for Social Justice, New York, on 26 September 2019 during the United Nations General Assembly (UNGA), with the aim "to give a voice to African women and change how they're perceived".

== Leadership and appointments ==
Balonwu's consultancy RDF was appointed to develop the concept for Lagos to the World (L2W), a global campaign in 2018 by the Lagos State government to drive foreign investment to the state.

== Awards and achievements ==
On 25 October 2019, Balonwu received the Powerlist 2020 International award. The power list black excellence awards features 100 of the UK's most influential black people. Balonwu was the recipient of the International Award, "which is given to a person based outside of the UK, who is considered to have distinguished themselves as a change-maker, innovator, inspiration and person of considerable influence" in recognition of her work at African Women on Board.

In March 2016, Media publication, YNaija, in partnership with Leading Ladies Africa ranked Balonwu among the 100 Most Inspiring Women in Nigeria, an annual release that features "women who are deliberately impacting their world and local communities through the power and strength of their ideas and achievement." Balonwu received the honour for her work at Spinlet in "Revolution[ising] the way music content is shared and distributed".

In 2010, Balonwu was a recipient of the Founder Region Fellowship, a gift-giving body that focuses on "improving the lives of women and girls locally and globally by giving fellowships to women who will truly make a difference in the world." Balonwu won the prize under a Law and Social Science focus and a legal dissertation based on analyzing the opportunities that the African film industry, "Nollywood" offers to women as a catalyst for economic development.

== Public speaking and media commentary ==
Balonwu has been featured on various platforms on topics ranging from gender equality, technology, innovation and entrepreneurship.

On podcast a16z, started by VC fund Andreessen Horowitz, with past guest speakers including NBA player Andre Iguodala and Oprah Winfrey, Balonwu spoke on technology in Africa. Harvard Business School's Dynamic Women in Business Conference in 2018 featured Nkiru Balonwu as a 'women on boards' panelist.

On Radio France Internationale (RFI) a French public radio service with 35.6 million listeners worldwide, Balonwu spoke on how to better engage African women.

She is listed as a mentor at the Founder Institute, the world's largest pre-seed startup accelerator. In August 2025, she delivered a keynote speech at the QEDNG Creative Powerhouse Summit, highlighting eleven key takeaways.

=== Published articles ===
Balonwu has written articles for various media outlets including Sahara Reporters, TechCabal and Al Jazeera English. Her work delves deeply into women’s issues and the cultural and creative industries (CCI), establishing her as a leading voice in these fields.

- "African Women As Consumers: Key To Unlocking Africa’s Growth"; February 2020
- "Propelling African women is essential to African business"; December 2019
- "Why not #MeToo? How stereotypes hinder African women's progress"; October 2019
- "Violence Against Women – Forget #Metoo, We Need #Youtoo to Stand with Women"; July 2019
- "Google CEO Sets New Benchmark for Modern Corporate Communications: Lessons for African Executives"’ February 2019
- "MTN Vs. the Government: Is Poor Communications Hurting Nigeria’s Economy?"; October 2018
- "Brexit, Macron’s visit: Opportunities and new alliances for Nigeria"; July 2018
- "Women in Stem: Time to Recalculate Our Approach?"; May 2018
- "Men as Allies: Pressing for Progress and Workplace Equality in Africa"; March 2018
- "Making African Women's Voices Mainstream"; January 2018, Business Day

== Board and advisory council memberships ==
Balonwu sits on boards of several organisations.
