= Adeo Ressi =

American entrepreneur and investor

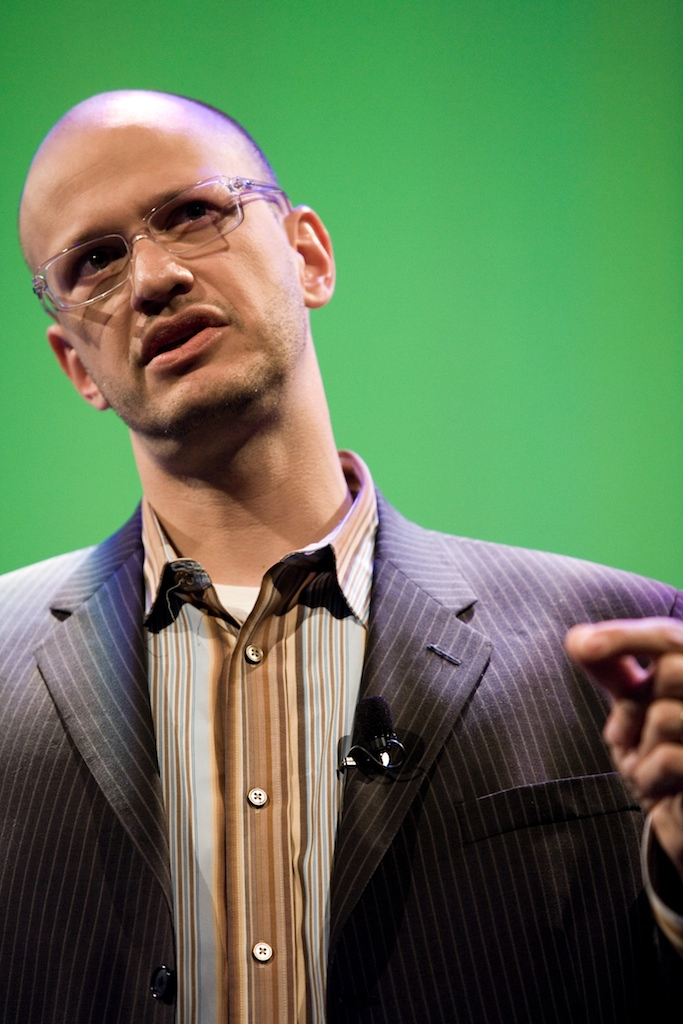
- Ressi in 2008
- Born: New York City, U.S.
- Education: University of Pennsylvania
- Occupation: Entrepreneur
- Known for: Founder & CEO of: Decile Group; The Founder Institute; TheFunded

Adeo Ressi is the founder and CEO of Decile Group and Executive Chairman of Founder Institute. Decile Group is a full-stack venture capital platform for emerging managers worldwide and helped launch nearly 50% of all VC firms in 2023 with the VC Lab accelerator. Founder Institute, a pre-seed accelerator, operates chapters in over 250 cities and supports more than 7,000 portfolio companies. Ressi’s previous startups, including Methodfive, Game Trust, and Total New York, resulted in nearly $2 billion in exits by the age of 30. He has also launched 14 venture capital funds, served on the board of the X Prize Foundation, and created TheFunded.

== Early life and education ==
Born Adeodato Gregory Ressi di Cervia on April 3, 1972, Ressi is Italian-American, and was raised in New York City's Upper West Side. As a child, he asked his parents to send him to Arcosanti, an experimental town in Arizona, rather than traditional summer camp. He spent four summers in Arcosanti as its youngest working resident. He was often tasked with performing menial jobs like cleaning out sewage pipes. His experiences at Arcosanti piqued his interest in environmental issues and influenced his career path to some degree.

Ressi attended college at the University of Pennsylvania where he spent time as a housemate of PayPal co-founder, Elon Musk. Ressi and Musk opened an unofficial "nightclub" at their house, boasting as many as 500 patrons on a single night. As an undergraduate, he founded the Social Revolutionary Club and started an environment-themed campus newspaper called, Green Times. He was an environmental studies major. He spent four years in college but did not receive his degree, because he wanted to use copies of Green Times as his senior thesis instead of writing a traditional paper.

== Career ==
After ending his collegiate career, Ressi co-founded Total New York, a localized news website, in 1994. In 1997, America Online purchased Total New York for an undisclosed amount of money and redubbed it AOL Digital City. Ressi founded methodfive, a web development firm, in 1995 and sold it to Xceed in 2000 for $88 million. Ressi used the money from his previous two ventures to found Game Trust, a developer of online casual game infrastructure, in 2002. Game Trust had a successful first round of funding in 2003, securing investments from Silicon Valley Venture Partners and Intel Capital.

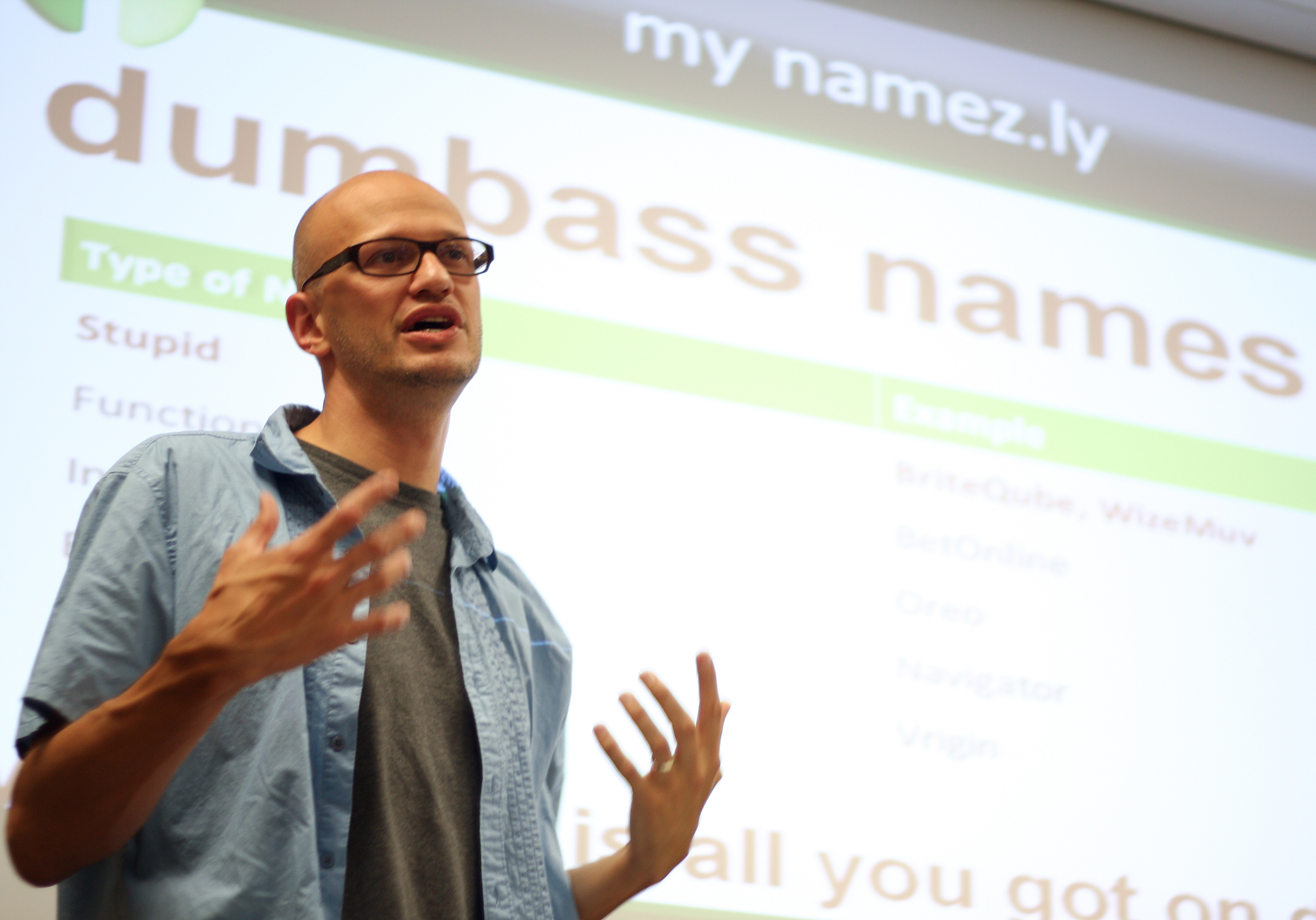
Adeo Ressi speaking at a conference in 2010.

The second round of funding was due to be provided by Softbank Capital in 2005. On the day of the deal, however, representatives from Softbank informed Ressi that they were pulling out. The investment would have been worth $10 million. Because Ressi was contractually obligated to not seek other investors while negotiating with Softbank, Game Trust was left with little remaining capital. Ressi was forced to take out a bridge loan from existing investors to keep Game Trust afloat. Even so, by the fall of 2005, Game Trust had secured $9 million in funding, including $3 million from TWJ Capital. After a failed development project at Game Trust in 2006, Elon Musk was voted off the board of directors and replaced with the son of TWJ Capital founder Thomas Jones. Jones would try unsuccessfully to take control of Game Trust away from Ressi.

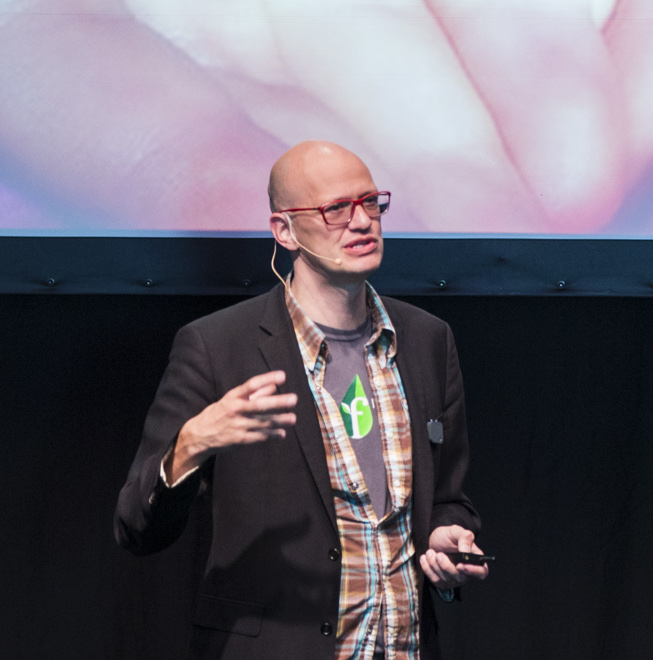
Adeo Ressi speaking at the Startup Festival 2014.

Ressi eventually sold Game Trust to RealNetworks in 2007, but his experience with venture capitalists led him to start TheFunded in 2007. The website is designed to allow entrepreneurs to write anonymous reviews about venture capital groups and their processes. The website was met with derision from venture capital groups, but proved to be popular among entrepreneurs. Ressi intended to keep the site anonymous, but news about its existence leaked to TechCrunch. The site had 1,000 anonymous entrepreneur members by March 2007. In order to remain anonymous himself, Ressi adopted the pseudonym of "Ted." In November 2007, Ressi decided to reveal his identity in a piece in Wired. By January 2008, TheFunded had 3,600 members.

In 2009, Ressi embarked on another venture called The Founder Institute, a startup incubator and entrepreneur training program headquartered in Palo Alto, California. The organization was co-founded with longtime colleague Jonathan Greechan. The goal of the institute was to combat startup failure and "globalize Silicon Valley." As of 2014, the institute had expanded to over 80 cities and 40 nations worldwide. Ressi wanted to help entrepreneurs create better businesses, and also wanted to understand the ingredients for a successful entrepreneur.

In 2011, in collaboration with Orrick Law Firm, Ressi and the Founder Institute released the Founder Advisor Standard Template ("FAST" Agreement), a simple legal framework entrepreneurs can use freely to create relationships with business advisors.

In 2012, in collaboration with Wilson Sonsini Goodrich Rosati, Ressi and the Founder Institute released "Convertible Equity", a financing vehicle that provides all of the flexibility of convertible debt without hindering a company with loans. Convertible Equity was given by Ressi to attorneys at Y Combinator and was renamed the SAFE Note. In addition, he was interviewed by The New York Times as part of a cover story of the Sunday Business Section of the newspaper.

In 2015, Ressi was featured on the cover of Entrepreneur Magazine, and began writing as a Guest Contributor to Forbes Magazine.

In 2020, Ressi launched VC Lab, a free training program for venture capitalists worldwide, as part of the Founder Institute, which was covered in TechCrunch.

In 2021, VC Lab was spun out as an independent company, as part of Decile Group, and Ressi became the CEO of Decile Group and Executive Chairman of Founder Institute. Ressi emphasizes innovation in his work, aiming to transform venture capital into a force for good and to fund impactful companies. Founder Institute targets having 80% of its portfolio companies work on For Progress businesses that address one or more of the 17 United Nations Sustainable Development Goals. VC Lab created the Mensarius Oath, an ethical code of conduct for investment professionals, and asks every venture firm that it works with to publicly support the Mensarius Oath.

In 2023, Ressi led the development of a large language model for venture capital at Decile Group, called Decile Base.
