= Daniel Isenberg =

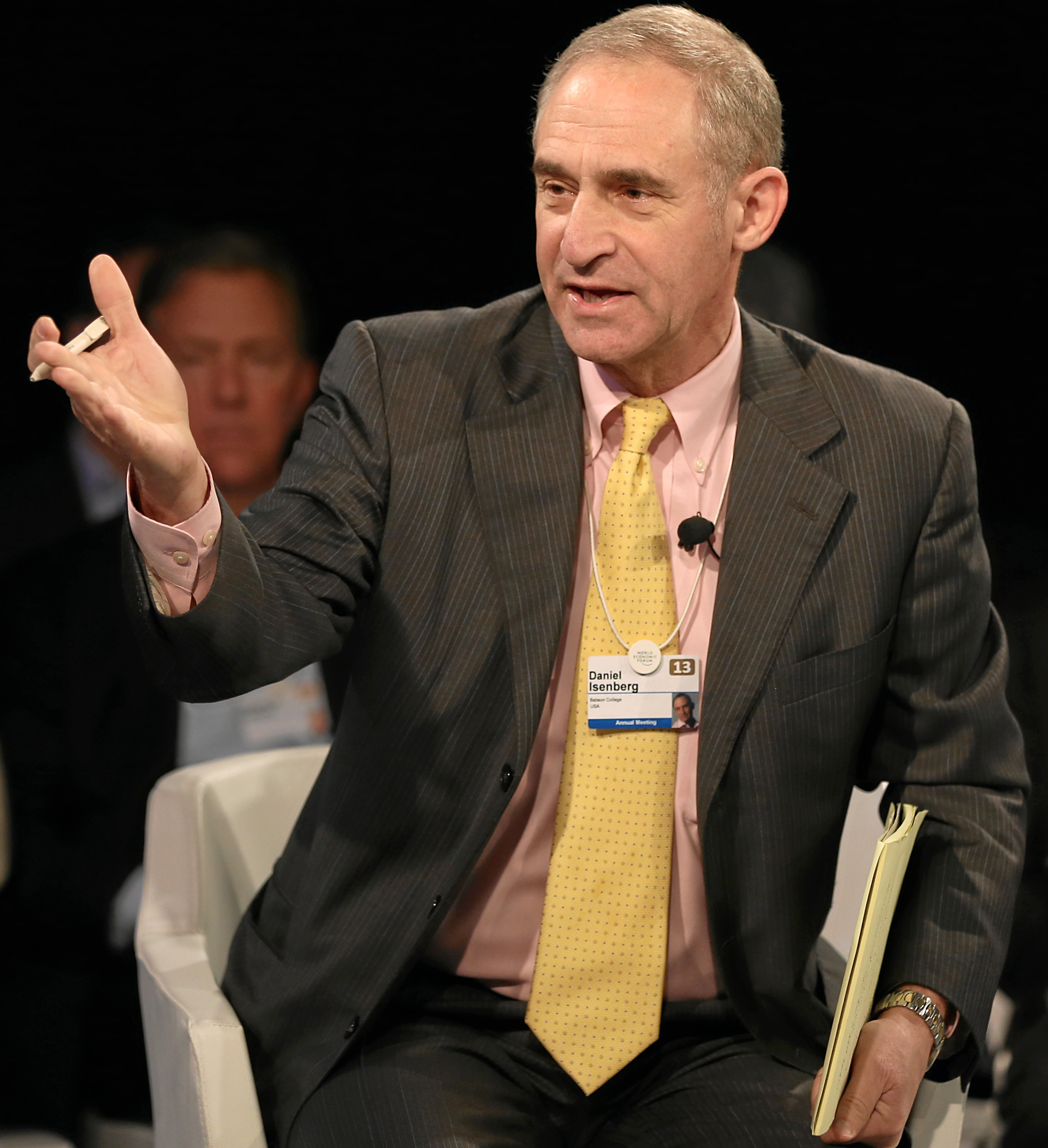
Isenberg during the World Economic Forum 2013

Daniel Isenberg is a Professor of Entrepreneurship Practice at Babson College Executive Education where he established the Babson Entrepreneurship Ecosystem Project (BEEP). He is the author of the book Worthless, Impossible and Stupid: How Contrarian Entrepreneurs Create and Capture Extraordinary Value (Harvard Business Press, 2013). Isenberg was an entrepreneur himself for 16 years and was also a venture capitalist. He is an angel investor in several ventures.

== Career ==
In 1981 Isenberg was awarded his Ph.D. in social psychology from Harvard University. Isenberg taught at the Harvard Business School from 1981-1987 in the Organizational Behavior unit and from 2005-2009 in the Entrepreneurial Management unit. Isenberg designed and led HBS’s new India and Israel International Immersion Programs on entrepreneurship. He has been a visiting or adjunct professor at Babson College, Columbia, INSEAD, Reykjavik, and the Technion. At Technion he created and taught the first graduate course in entrepreneurship in 1987-1989, co-founded the Tefen Entrepreneurs Program with Stef Wertheimer, and directed the Technion Entrepreneurial Associates with Professor Ed Roberts from MIT.

Isenberg wrote Worthless, Impossible and Stupid: How Contrarian Entrepreneurs Create and Capture Extraordinary Value published by Harvard Business Press (2013). At the Harvard Business School Entrepreneurial Management unit, Isenberg published over three dozen cases on entrepreneurship, as well as numerous seminal articles in the Harvard Business Review, including The Global Entrepreneur (2008), Entrepreneurs and the Cult of Failure (2011) and How to Start an Entrepreneurial Revolution (2010).

He writes a blog for the Harvard Business Review and also blogs for The Economist, Forbes, and The Huffington Post.

== Business leadership ==
In 1990 Isenberg founded Triangle Technologies in Israel, which he ran as CEO until 2005. He helped established two venture capital funds and from 1997-2001 Isenberg was a general partner at Jerusalem Venture Partners, and since has personally invested in over a dozen startup ventures, including Cyota and My Basis, both of which were acquired.
