= TheFunded =

Review website

- Type: Privately Held Corporation
- Industry: Investor ratings and reviews
- Founded: 2007; 19 years ago in New York City
- Founder: Adeo Ressi
- Website: www.thefunded.com

TheFunded is a review website that allows users to post anonymous ratings and reviews of venture capital investment firms. It was founded in 2007 by entrepreneur Adeo Ressi. In addition to providing ratings and reviews, users can communicate with one another to garner entrepreneurial insight and advice. In 2011, the site had over 16,000 users, more than 25,000 reviews, and over 24,000 user comments.

== History ==
Adeo Ressi began working on TheFunded in December 2006 and unveiled an early version of the site on New Year's Eve. The site was initially intended for Ressi's personal use. Due to negative experiences with venture capital firms in the previous year, he wanted to keep closer tabs on his investors. He was also going to allow his close CEO friends to provide their own feedback. In total, the site had about a dozen users for the first three months. In March 2007, however, information about the site had leaked to TechCrunch, and TheFunded received numerous applications to join. Ressi allowed about 100 new users to sign up, but the user base grew to 1,000 by May. In January 2008, the site had 4,600 users.

The goal of TheFunded was always to provide more transparency in how venture capitalists dealt with clients. The nature of the site's ratings and reviews, however, has been described as candid, scathing, and even nasty. In the early days of TheFunded, Ressi adopted the pseudonym "Ted" to avoid the ire of venture capitalists in Silicon Valley. The identity of "Ted" was a frequent source of speculation among venture capitalists and entrepreneurs. Because Ressi had heard rumors about his identity being revealed, he decided to reveal his identity on his own terms in a piece in Wired on November 15, 2007.

TheFunded was the subject of numerous defamation lawsuits from venture capital firms in 2008 and beyond. Some estimates suggest that TheFunded received angry letters from lawyers at least twice per week. The lawsuits were almost universally dismissed because the Communications Decency Act stipulated that TheFunded could not be held liable for third-party comments on their website. Additionally, the users leaving the comments remained completely anonymous.

In 2009, TheFunded unveiled a list of "blacklisted" venture capital firms. Inclusion on the list meant that these firms were suspected of pressuring clients to give positive reviews, threatening legal action against TheFunded or its members, or failing to make new investments. Users were urged to avoid doing business with these firms. By 2011, the site had over 16,000 users, more than 25,000 reviews, and over 24,000 user comments. This was despite the fact that the site had seen a marked downturn in user traffic.

== Features ==
TheFunded allows users (typically entrepreneurs and CEOs) to rate and review venture capitalists and engage in community activities and discussions. All actions on the website are carried out anonymously. The site maintains an "Advice" section where entrepreneurs can formulate and discuss plans for business growth. The rating system is based on a scale from 1 to 5, with 5 being the best. Users can then leave comments to explain their rating. The "Banned VCs" feature on TheFunded prohibits venture capital firms from appearing on the site's "Leaderboard," which identifies the most highly-rated firms and investors.

Gaining membership to the site was initially an "invite-only" proposition. Now, users can "apply" for membership. TheFunded only permits certain qualified individuals to join in order to reduce vandalism. The site earns money from both advertising and subscriptions. Subscriptions to the site provide full access to special features and cost around $400 per year.
