= African Women on Board =

Nigeria-based non-profit organisation

African Women on Board (AWB) is an independent non-profit, African women-led organisation headquartered in Lagos, Nigeria, working to advance narratives and improve realities for African women and girls globally. The organisation is made up of women of African heritage from around the world.

== History ==
African Women on Board was founded by Dr. Nkiru Balonwu in 2017. The organisation started out as a network of women working together to advance the economic, social and political rights of African women. AWB's current mandate includes finding solutions to getting women into senior management, C-suite and board positions. AWB also works to include African women's narratives in global conversations so that African women's perspectives will inform policy making. AWB emphasizes recruiting allies from all backgrounds – female and male – to advance the work of making life better for African women and girls.

== Activities ==
African Women on Board's activities consist of programming and workshops to build women's capacities in their careers and businesses, and international round tables and forums to drive discussions on topical issues affecting African women. AWB formed partnerships with several organisations to broaden its impact. African Women on Board is a Ford Foundation Grant recipient, collaborating on masterclasses for women in politics, investment and financial literacy. AWB is working with the Wikimedia Foundation to profile notable African women on the platform. AWB is also partnering with the London Stock Exchange Africa Advisory Group to produce a report on activating female entrepreneurship. AWB is seeking to address the gaps in female IT and tech talent. They are partnering with reputable institutions such as the Heartland Incubation Hub of the Oluaka Institute, a government-certified computer and technical training institution, and Imaginarium, a creative design and content studio, to support training programmes for young women and girls, age five and upwards, in areas of 2D gaming, animation, web pages and computer applications.

African Women on Board had its global launch at the Ford Foundation Center for Social Justice on Thursday 26 September 2019 in New York during the UN General Assembly. The event, tagged AWB@UNGA, was about fast tracking black women into leadership roles of the future.
