= Zirtual =

American company

Zirtuall
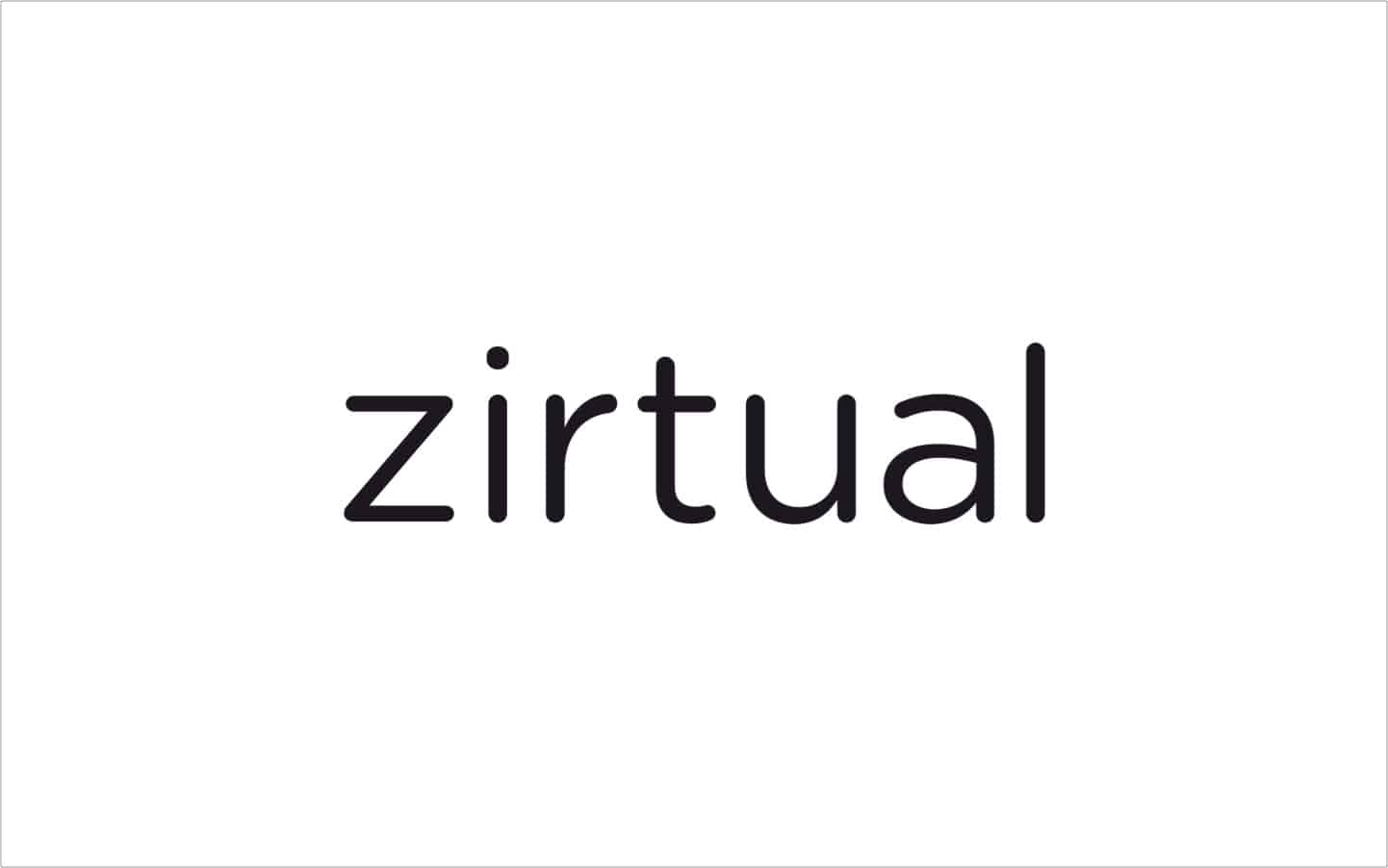
- Founded: 2011
- Headquarters: Columbus, OH
- Parent: Startups.com
- Website: zirtual.com

Zirtual, founded in 2011, is a privately held American company that provides virtual assistant services to professionals, entrepreneurs and small corporate teams. Zirtual is headquartered in Columbus, OH, under the parent company Startups.com.

Zirtual is considered a part of the sharing economy, similar to ride-sharing services Uber and Lyft, car-sharing service Zipcar, and home-sharing service Airbnb. Zirtual assigns ZAs to serve multiple clients within their time zone to perform administrative tasks. Each client, however, interacts with one, dedicated assistant. ZAs perform duties such as: responding to emails, scheduling meetings and appointments, researching and ordering products, services and gifts, making travel arrangements, coordinating events, performing market research, and other tasks as requested.

Zirtual hires VAs as independent contractors.

== Company history ==
Zirtual was founded by Maren Kate Donovan, though she has had no part in the company since its 2015 implosion. Donovan launched her first startup in college selling jewelry on eBay. While bartending to pay for college, she launched a second business, a social marketing firm powered by offshore assistants and remote-working college students. During this process, she started the blog “Escaping the 9 to 5.” Donovan developed the Zirtual business model in 2010, during the four-month program at The Founder Institute, an entrepreneur training, and startup launch incubator program, and launched the company upon graduation.

In January 2013, Zirtual acquired $2 million in seed funding from Zappos.com founder Tony Hsieh, the VegasTechFund, and Mayfield Fund. In October 2014, Zirtual received $250,000 in debt financing from TenOneTen Ventures and Melo7 Tech Partners. In December 2014, Zirtual secured an additional $2 million as a convertible note from TenOneTen Ventures, Mayfield Fund, Structure Capital, 10.10.10, Jason Calacanis, VegasTechFund and Recruit Strategic Partners.

In an August 10, 2015 email to customers, Donovan announced a cessation of operations until further notice. "It is with an incredibly heavy heart that I have to send this message. As of today, August 10th 2015, Zirtual is pausing all operations. Due to a combination of market circumstances and financial constraints we must re-organize our current structure if we are to successfully serve you in the future."

On August 11, former customers were notified that the company would resume operations by August 17. In an interview with Fortune.com, Donovan discusses what went wrong with the finances. Startups.com, the parent company of services such as Launchrock, Clarity, and Fundable, acquired Zirtual in an all-stock transaction.
