= Microsoft Student Ambassadors =

Student ambassador program established by Microsoft in 2001

- Abbreviation: MSA
- Formation: 2001
- Founder: Microsoft
- Type: Educational, promotional
- Headquarters: Redmond, Washington, United States
- Region served: Worldwide
- Members: 2,880+ members (2026)
- Parent organization: Microsoft
- Website: mvp.microsoft.com/en-US/studentambassadors studentambassadors.microsoft.com

Microsoft Student Ambassadors (MSA; formerly Microsoft Student Partners) is a program designed to sponsor students majoring in disciplines related to technology. The program enhances students' employability by offering training in skills not usually taught in academia, including knowledge of Microsoft technologies.

== History ==
The program was first launched in 2001 as Microsoft Student Partners. At that time, it operated only in fifteen countries. In late 2006, Microsoft announced plans to expand the program to fifty more countries worldwide. By 2010, it had 2,800 members across 101 countries. In 2019, the program was restructured as Microsoft Learn Student Ambassadors, aligning the program with Microsoft Learn, Microsoft’s official online training platform. As of 18 July 2025, the program remains active under the name 'Microsoft Student Ambassadors' .

== Purpose ==
The program is an educational and promotional program to sponsor undergraduate and postgraduate students majoring in disciplines related to technology, typically computer science, computer information systems, and information technology. It also aims to enhance students' employability and increase students' awareness of Microsoft technologies. Student Ambassadors are offered training, particularly in product-specific skills that are not typically taught in academia.

The program aims to increase awareness of Microsoft products, programs, and initiatives. Consequently, the program helps expand the user base of Microsoft products, and results in better availability of properly educated workforce in those technologies.

== Membership ==
Participation in the program is limited to students aged 18 and above who are enrolled in an accredited higher education institution. Since its relaunch as Microsoft Student Ambassadors on 30 March 2026 , the program has been organized into three milestones of progression: New, Associate, and Senior. Progression depends on contributions such as organizing events, creating technical content, or mentoring peers. Ambassadors receive access to Microsoft technologies, training resources, and certification opportunities. Other benefits include Azure credits, exam vouchers, and invitations to exclusive community events.

== See also ==
- Imagine Cup
- DreamSpark
- MSDN Academic Alliance
- Microsoft Certified Professional
- Microsoft Developer Network
- Microsoft Most Valuable Professional
- Microsoft Research
