= National Council on Climate Change =

Nigerian climate change agency

Agency overview
- Formed: 2022
- Type: Climate Change
- Agency executive: Omotenioye Majekodunmi
- Website: https://natccc.gov.ng/

The National Council on Climate Change is the national designated authority responsible for combating climate change and its impact in Nigeria. The Council was inaugurated in 2022 by former President Muhammadu Buhari to help formulate policies that will help achieve a green and sustainable economy in Nigeria. The composition of the Council includes The President of the Federal Republic of Nigeria as Chairman, the Vice President as Vice Chairman while the Director General of the Council as Secretary. In 2022, President Muhammadu Buhari appointed Salisu Dahiru as the pioneer Director-General of the Council.

== Structure ==
The structure of the National Council of Climate Change comprised actors from different sectors and Ministries. The membership include:

- President of the Federal Republic of Nigeria - Chairman
- Vice President, Federal Republic of Nigeria - Vice Chairman
- Director General, National Council on Climate Change - Secretary

Other members include the Ministers of Environment; Water Resources; Power; Transportation; Mines and Steel Development; Agriculture and Rural Development; Women Affairs and Social Development; Finance, Budget, and National Planning; as well as the Attorney General of the Federation and Minister of Justice.

== Appointment of leadership ==
On the 31st of July 2025, President Bola Ahmed Tinubu appointed Mrs. Omotenioye Majekodunmi as the new Director-General of the National Council on Climate Change. She takes over from Dr. Nkiruka Madueke, the Council’s Director-General, who was appointed in June 2024 and is credited with laying the groundwork for the agency’s institutional development. Majekodunmi, a seasoned climate finance expert and environmental lawyer, brings over 17 years of experience to the role.

On the 9th of June 2024, president Bola Ahmed Tinubu appointed Nkiruka Maduekwe as the Director-General/Chief Executive Officer of the national council of climate change in Nigeria (NCCC).

Dr. Salisu Mohammed Dahiru was appointed by President Muhammadu Buhari on 25 July 2022 as the pioneer Director-General and Chief Executive Officer of the National Council on Climate Change (NCCC). In this role, he was responsible for establishing the NCCC Secretariat and operationalising the provisions of the Climate Change Act, 2021 during its formative stage. His mandate included leading the initial implementation of the Council’s statutory responsibilities, such as developing Nigeria’s five-year carbon budget, setting annual emissions reduction targets, and initiating frameworks for carbon pricing and emissions trading. He also oversaw the early development of the National Climate Change Action Plan and the Climate Change Fund, while coordinating cross-ministerial and stakeholder engagement to integrate climate action into national planning.

== Activities of the National Council on Climate Change ==
As NCCC is related to climate change activities in Nigeria, it has collaborated with other stakeholders and organizations to create a friendly environment for the world we want. On 2 February 2024, it signed a Memorandum of Understanding (MoU) with Climate Action Africa (CAA) for partnership on seeking strategies for climate action in Nigeria. This was signed in their office in Abuja, the Federal Capital Territory, Nigeria. According to the Director General of NCCC, Dr. Salisu Dahiru "our collaboration with Climate Action Africa is a pivotal step towards building a climate-resilient Nigeria. Through joint efforts, we aim to promptly address vulnerabilities and work towards sustainable solutions for our nation.” This goes to show the commitment to tackling climate change in Nigeria.

=== Deforestation prevention ===
National Council on Climate Change has moved to prevent global warming and prevent deforestation in kastina state Nigeria, to enhance an Eco friendly environment in the state and across Nigeria.

== See also ==
- Geography of Nigeria
- Sustainable Development Goals and Nigeria
- Agriculture in Nigeria
