= Anambra State ICT Agency =

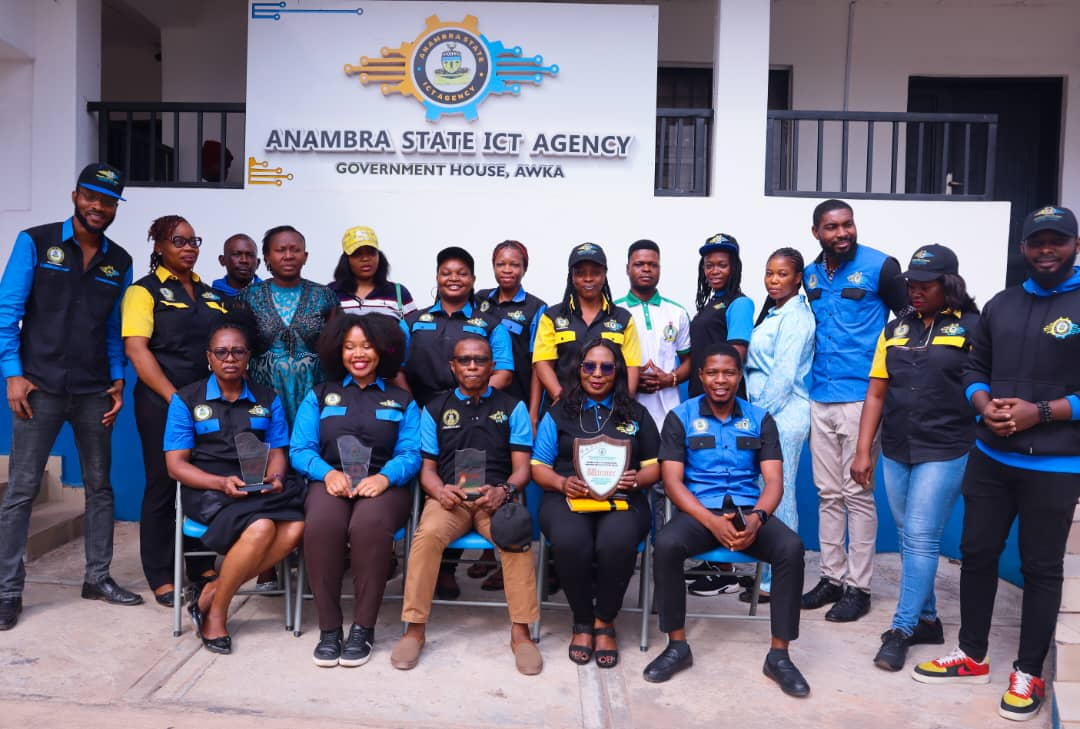
Anambra State Agency ICT

Anambra State ICT Agency, established in 2019, is a parastatal under the Anambra State Government to drive ICT innovations for a digital state. The parastatal was established under the administration of the former Governor – Chief Willie Obiano. The Agency was charged with the responsibility of building a proactive live digital tribe to position the state in the global trend of positive smart States for sustainable development. Thus, it has the mantra, "Everything technology and technology Everywhere."

The State ICT Agency pioneered many technologically operated systems of e-identity cards for Anambra State civil servants, budget process with ICT, and payment of taxes. These have helped to create e-governance and government transparency in Anambra State. Thus, ICT in governance has been adjudged to improve governance while providing leverage for growth for both the government and the citizens. This shows the role of government in adopting ICT in public services not just in Anambra state but in Africa and globally for sustainable development goals.

It must be mentioned that Anambra State ICT Agency was instrumental in the Technology Awards won by Anambra State Government during the ICT peer review session at the 11th National Council on Communication, Innovation and Digital Economy (NCCIDE) meeting held in Kano on 22 January 2024. The managing director/chief executive officer of Anambra State ICT Agency, Chukwuemeka Fred Agbata received the awards on behalf of the Anambra State Government. He dedicated the awards to the Team at the Anambra State ICT Agency, the cooperators and collaborators of the Governor's digital vision.

== Historical development ==
Anambra State ICT Agency was hinged on the global trend of inclusive technology and digital spaces across all sectors in the Anambra State Government. This led to the establishment in 2019 by the then Governor of Anambra State – Chief Willie Obiano. According to the Governor, "Anambra State is at the forefront of the drive to unleash technology potentials on the people, in line with my vision to create a pool of young people that will dictate the pace in the digital space. Viable platforms are being created for ndị Anambra especially digital entrepreneurs and social media nomads to share ideas, explore opportunities, and access tools, training, and expertise for self-development, value reorientation, and wealth creation."

With digitization and the concept of the Fourth Industrial Revolution, it became clear that the government agenda must create spaces for technological operations. It should be remembered that the National Information Technology Development Agency (NITDA) was contacted for the development of Information and Communication Technology (ICT) in Anambra state. The then Director General NITDA, Mr. Peter Jack stated that "the agency will study what the state has put on the ground towards the setting up of ICT friendly environment and determine how to improve on it." Thus, The Anambra State ICT Agency was created with the train–the–trainer program for capacity building and operations.

Then on 18 January 2022, Governor Chukwuma Charles Soludo appointed Chukwuemeka Fred Agbata as the managing director/CEO of Anambra State ICT Agency. Thus, from traditional services to the adoption and adaptation of ICT, the agency ICT started operations. It started widening its broadband access and digitizing government services as well as supporting technological startups.

The drive to transform every government sector into digital spaces started which included the legislative arm of the state. The Agency ICT met with the State House of Assembly to digitize the state legislative process. The essence is to enable digital access to state laws and other legislative instruments by the citizens.

The MD/CEO of Anambra State Agency, Chuwkuemeka Fred Agbata mapped out collaborations with other Directors and ICT-related agencies in the state to integrate digital practices and economy, even among the youth in the state.

== Activities ==
Anambra State ICT Agency has started mapping the state and transforming the ministries into digitalized spaces. It has organized the internet presence of all Ministries, Departments, and Agencies under the Anambra State government with different domains and servers under a standard domain of anambrastate.gov.ng.

In 2023, Anambra State Government conducted teachers’ recruitment exercise through Computer-Based Tests. The Anambra State ICT Agency offered the technical support for a seamless exercise. About 3000 teachers were targeted for posting into the Post Primary School Service Commission and the State Universal Basic Education Board (ASUBEB). The Chairman of ASUBEB, Dr. Nkiru Vera Nwadinobi acknowledged the support and partnership of the ICT Agency for a good job in the whole exercise. In his response, the MD/CEO of the State ICT Agency, Chukwuemeka Fred Agbata (CFA) stated that, "his agency is providing technical support for the process, as the government agency with the mandate to deliver the ‘Everything Technology and Technology Everywhere’ vision of Mr. Governor.

=== Training ===
It has been engaging in collaborations and training of human resources to live up to the 2030 Agenda and the need for access to Information and Communication Technologies (ICTs) under Sustainable Development Goal 9 (SDG 9) which states to "build resilient infrastructure, promote inclusive and sustainable industrialization and foster innovation.

There was capacity building of civil servants in Anambra State on digital technology for efficient government services.

Again was the training of members of Civil Society Organisations (CSOs) in Anambra State on digital literacy to increase their relevance in the technology-driven world of the 21st century.

It organized a one-day training for selected journalists in Anambra State. The training was in collaboration with the State Ministry of Information, PA-CENT Technologies, and Bonitas Technologies in July 2023.

=== Collaboration ===
The ICT Agency collaborated with Internet Exchange Point of Nigeria (IXPN) for the establishment of Internet exchange points. This will make Anambra one of the states in Nigeria with the location of IXPN presence with direct interconnection for low cost, low latency, and increased internet bandwidth.

Anambra State government announced its collaboration with United States' high-tech companies for technology collaboration and innovation. The State delegation to the United States government included the CEO of Anambra State Agency ICT – Mr Chukwuemeka Fred Agbata and other stakeholders on tech innovative hubs. The ICT Agency becomes part of the Anambra State Government parastatals to navigate the shared technologies on the collaboration.

It also collaborated with the Anambra State Ministry of Education and Integrated Youth Empowerment Development Strategies (IYEDS) in what is called "providing a platform for aspiring entrepreneurs to showcase their talents, exchange ideas, and gain valuable insights from experienced professionals in the field of Tech." The program was targeted for secondary school students in Anambra State educational zones.
