= Project management information system =

Logistics system on completing project goals

A project management information system (PMIS) is the logical organization of the information required for an organization to execute projects successfully. A PMIS is typically one or more software applications and a methodical process for collecting and using project information. These electronic systems "help [to] plan, execute, and close project management goals." PMIS systems differ in scope, design and features depending upon an organisation's operational requirements.

== PMIS PMBOK 5th edition definition ==
The project management information system, which is part of the environmental factors, provides access to tools, such as a scheduling tool, a work authorization system, a configuration management system, an information collection and distribution system, or interfaces to other online automated systems. Automated gathering and reporting on key performance indicators (KPI) can be part of this system.

== Project management information system software ==
At the center of any modern PMIS is a software. Project management information system can vary from something as simple as a File system containing Microsoft Excel documents, to a full blown enterprise PMIS software.

=== Characteristics of a PMIS ===
The methodological process used to collect and organize project information can match normalized methodologies such as PRINCE2.

A PMIS Software supports all Project management knowledge areas such as Integration Management, Project Scope Management, Project Time Management, Project Cost Management, Project Quality Management, Project Human Resource Management, Project Communications Management, Project Risk Management, Project Procurement Management, and Project Stakeholder Management.

A PMIS Software is a multi-user application, and can be cloud based or hosted on-premises.

== Relationship between a PMS and PMIS ==
A project management system (PMS) could be a part of a PMIS or sometimes an external tool beside project management information system. PMS is basically an aggregation of the processes, tools, techniques, methodologies, resources, and procedures to manage a project. What a PMIS does is to manage all stakeholders in a project such as the project owner, client, contractors, sub-contractors, in-house staff, workers, managers etc.
