= Nigeria Association of Computing Students =

Nigerian student organization

- Abbreviation: NACOS
- Type: Student organization
- Legal status: Active
- Purpose: To represent and support computing students across Nigeria
- Headquarters: Plot 10 Otumba Jobi Fele-way, Alausa Ikeja, Lagos State, Nigeria
- Location: Nigeria
- Region served: Nationwide
- Members: 1,000,000 members ▲
- Affiliations: Nigerian Computer Society (NCS), International Federation for Information Processing (IFIP), Association for Computing Machinery (ACM), Institute of Electrical and Electronics Engineers (IEEE), Microsoft Student Partners (MSP), Google Developer Group (GDG), National Information Technology Development Agency (NITDA), National Universities Commission (NUC)
- Website: nacos.org.ng

Nigeria Association of Computing Students (NACOS) is a student organization in Nigeria. NACOS was formed in 2020 to replace the Nigeria Association of Computer Science Students(NACOSS) established in 1993.

== History ==
The Nigerian Association of Computer Science Students (NACOSS) was founded in July 1993 by a group of students with the support of the Nigerian Computer Society (NCS), its parent body. NACOSS was established to represent students in computer-related disciplines across Nigeria's tertiary institutions, including Computer Science, Computer Engineering, and Information Technology.

By 2012, NACOSS had grown to include over 250,000 registered members in more than 150 local chapters spanning universities, polytechnics, and colleges of education across Nigeria's six geo-political zones. Its activities focus on capacity building, professional development, and fostering entrepreneurship in Information Technology.

In 2020, NACOSS transitioned into the Nigeria Association of Computing Students (NACOS) to reflect the broader scope of computing disciplines.
