= Startup ecosystem =

Type of business ecosystem

startup ecosystem

A Startup Ecosystem is a network of entrepreneurs, organizations, and resources that interact to support the creation, development, and growth of startup companies within a physical location or virtual community. These organizations can be further divided into categories such as universities, funding organizations, support organizations (like incubators, accelerators, co-working spaces etc.), research organizations, service provider organizations (like legal, financial services etc.) and large corporations. Local Governments and Government organizations such as Commerce / Industry / Economic Development departments also play an important role in a startup ecosystem. Different organizations typically focus on specific parts of the ecosystem function and startups at their specific development stage(s).

Startup ecosystems are influenced by a large assortment of things. Some things may include economic conditions, entrepreneurial culture, government policies, and access to financial and human capital. universities help through education and research, while incubators and accelerators provide mentorship and networking opportunities to grow. Government policies and infrastructure can influence startup growth Aswell. Access to these resources can differentiate among demographic groups, with research finding gender disparities in venture capital funding.

Startup ecosystems differ in size, structure, and available resources. Silicon Valley, NYC, Singapore and Tel Aviv are considered examples of global startup ecosystems. Organizations like Startup Genome and StartupBlink publish annual reports ranking startup ecosystems based on data like funding, startup activity, and business performance.

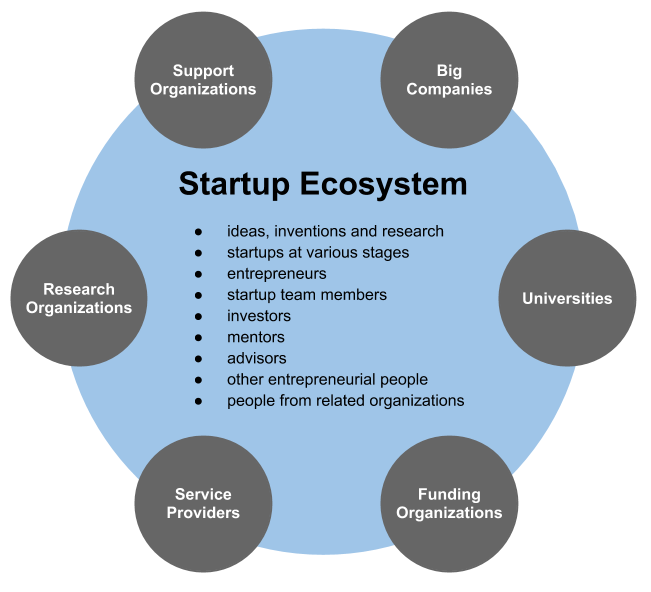
Startup ecosystem

== Composition of the startup ecosystem ==
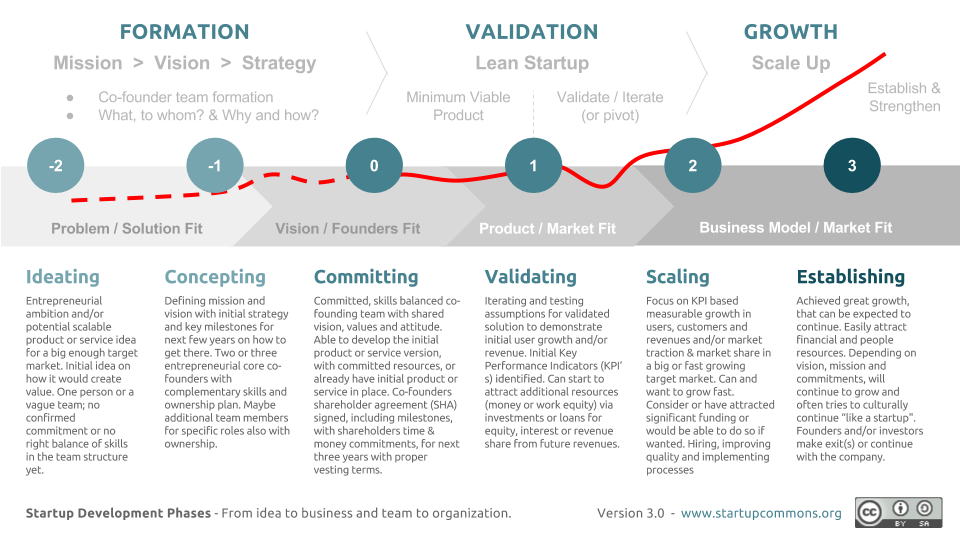
Startup development phases

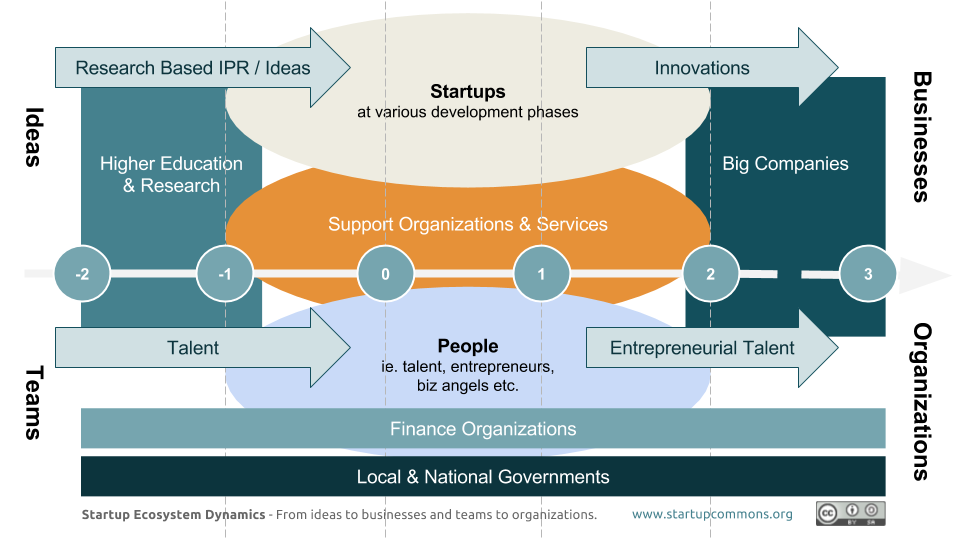
Startup ecosystem dynamics

- Ideas, inventions and research i.e., Intellectual property rights (IPR)
- Entrepreneurship Education
- Startups at various stages
- Entrepreneurs
- Start up team members
- Angel investors
- Startup mentors
- Startup advisors
- Other business-oriented people
- People from other organizations with start-up activities
- Startup events
- Venture Capitalists

== List of organizations and/or organized activities with startup activities ==
- Universities
- Students
  - Start-up competitions
- Social Networks
- Advisory and mentoring organizations
- Startup incubators
- Startup accelerators
- Coworking spaces
- Service providers (Consulting, Accounting, Legal, etc.)
- Event organizers
- Startup Business Model Evaluators
- Business Angel Networks
- Venture capital companies
- Equity Crowdfunding portals
- Corporates (telcos, banking, health, food, etc.)
- Other funding providers (loans, grants etc.)
- Start-up blogs and social networks
- Other facilitators

Investors from these roles are linked together through shared events, activities, locations, and interactions. Startup ecosystems generally encompass the network of interactions between people, organizations, and their environment. Any particular start-up ecosystem is defined by its collection of specific cities or online communities.

In addition, resources like skills, time, and money are also essential components of a start-up ecosystem. The resources that flow through ecosystems are obtained primarily from the meetings between people and organizations that are an active part of those startup ecosystems. These interactions help to create new potential startups and/or to strengthen the already existing ones.

== External and internal factors ==
Startup ecosystems are influenced by both external conditions and the resources available within the ecosystem itself. External factors include economic conditions, market changes, and government policies. Internal factors include access to funding, available talent, entrepreneurial culture, and relationships between startups and support organizations. These factors influence how startups develop and how ecosystems change over time.

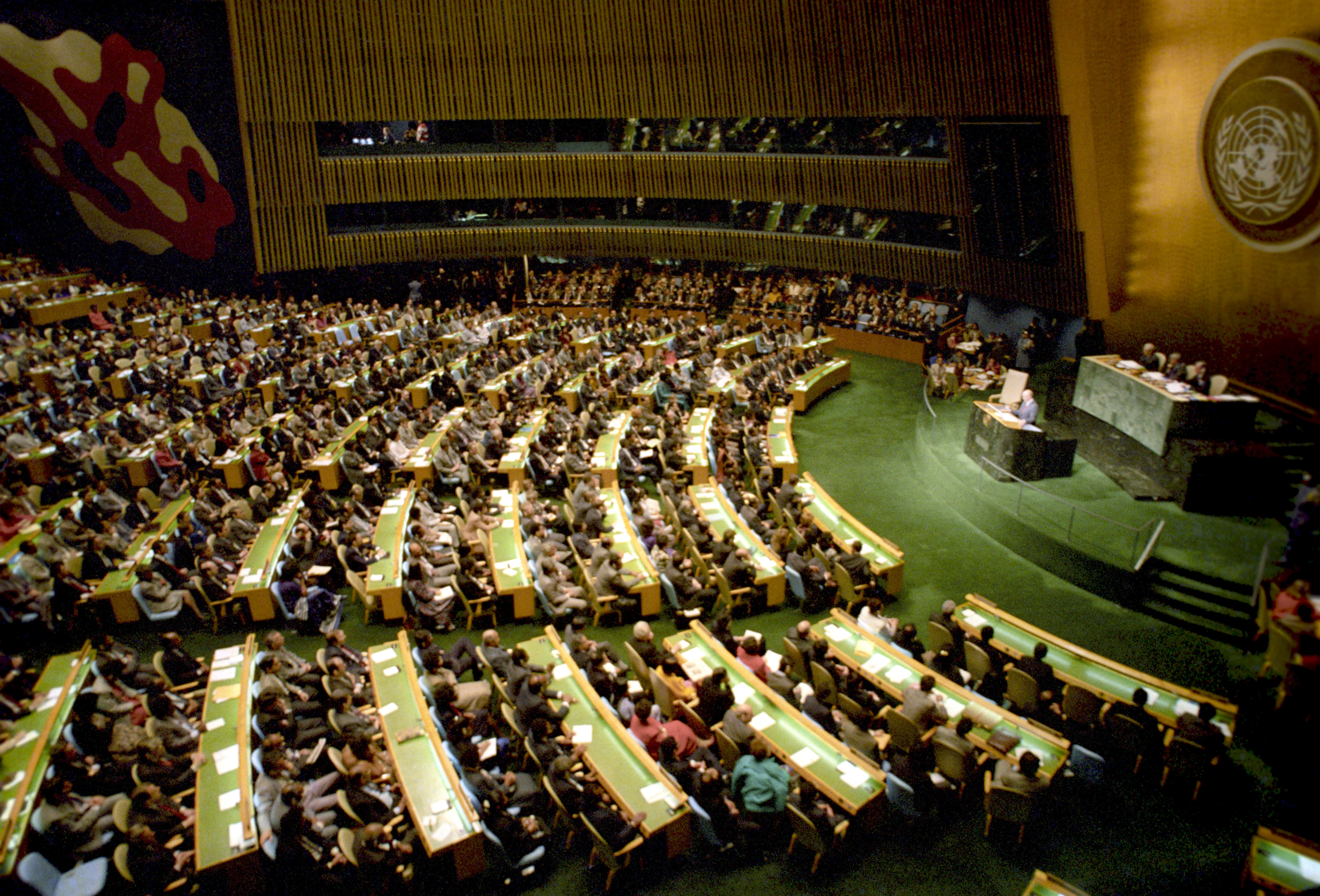
politics (factor affecting business as a whole including startup ecosystems)

Spigel identifies three types of attributes within entrepreneurial ecosystems: cultural, social, and material. Cultural attributes include entrepreneurial attitudes and histories of successful businesses. Social attributes include skilled workers, investment capital, mentors, and professional networks, Material attributes include universities, government policies, infrastructure, and support services.

Stam distinguishes between framework conditions, including institutions, culture, infrastructure, and market demand, and systematic conditions, such as networks, leadership, finance, talent, knowledge, and support services.

Startup ecosystems can develop differently across regions because of differences in local culture, business networks, and available resources. Spigel compares entrepreneurial ecosystems in waterloo, Ontario, and Calgary, Alberta, showing how different relationships between local resources and institutions can produce different ecosystem structures.

While some resource inputs are generally controlled by external processes like financial climate and market disruptions, the availability of resources within the ecosystem are controlled by every organization's ability to contribute towards the ecosystem.

== Key Components of Startup Ecosystems ==
Entrepreneurial ecosystems are made up of finance, talent, knowledge, and market demand. Some components of a startup ecosystem have a stronger association with entrepreneurial activity like demand, talent, and finance. Some large key components include access to funding, universities and talent, incubators and accelerators, and government support and infrastructure.

various cultures

Having resources isn't enough by itself, having cultural, social, and material attributes in relation to the other components help sustain the ecosystem. Startup ecosystems are not identical everywhere, factors like leadership, culture, finance, and markets affect how each region interacts with another.

Startup founders play a large role in startup ecosystems by building relationships with investors, universities, employees, and other businesses. These connections help the overall flow of a startup ecosystem. Founders who have experience running businesses can become mentors and share what they have learned with /p]5eople starting their own businesses as well.

=== Universities And Talent ===
Universities provide students with the resources to learn entrepreneurship. Through clubs, hands-on activities, and interacting with other like-minded students, universities enable students to develop entrepreneurial skills outside the classroom.

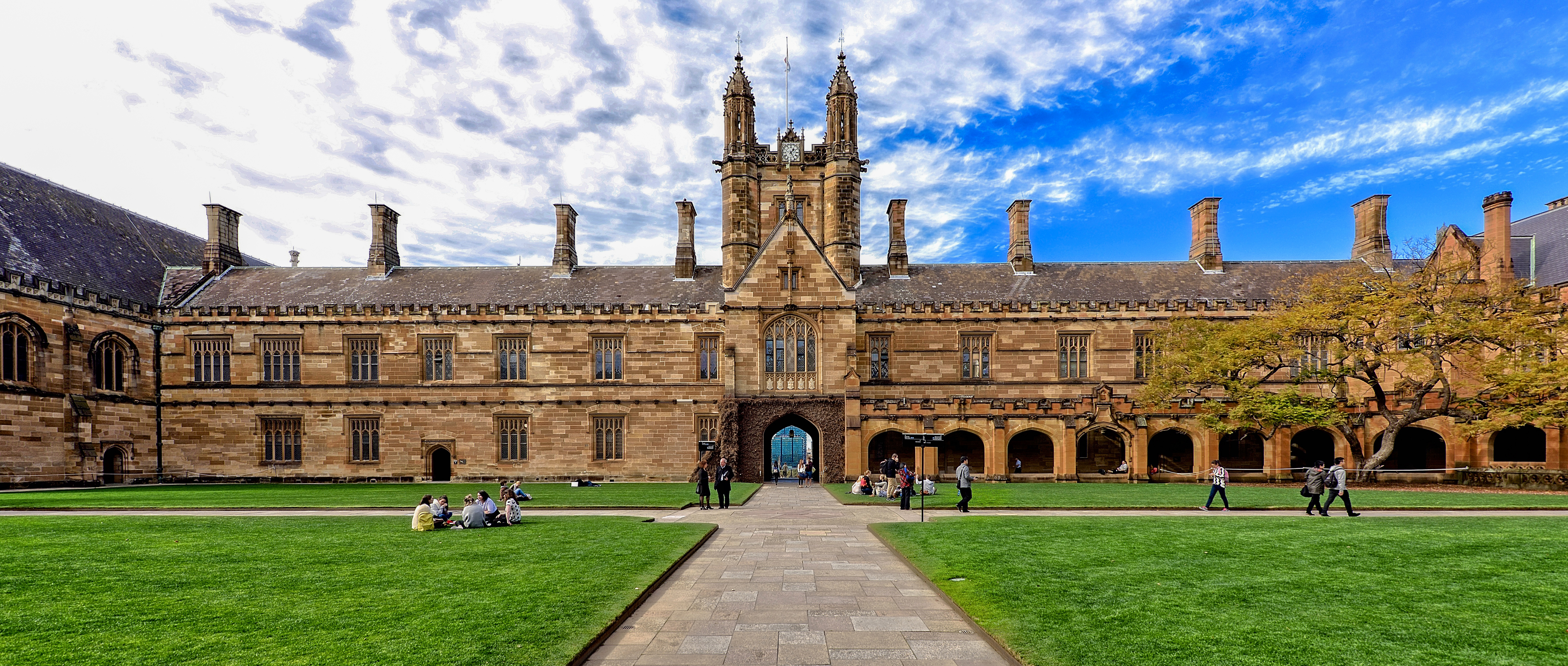
University of Sydney

Universities do not just educate students, they conduct research that can turn into business ideas. Prokop studied four university entrepreneurial ecosystems in the United Kingdom and found that universities with stronger connections to investors and entrepreneurs were better positioned to help create spin-offs. Spin offs are new companies created from research, technology, or ideas developed at a university.

Prokop also examined how geographic location matters when looking at your network available to help succeed in the startup ecosystem.

Startups also depend on the availability of people with useful skills. The availability of skilled workers can influence the development of startups in a region. A meta-analysis was taken from 257 studies, they identified talent was consistently linked to more entrepreneurial activity. Extraversion and social ability also has a strong correlation to entrepreneurship. On the other hand, different types of startups may need different conditions. Knowledge, culture, and support systems were very relevant when researchers analyzed productive entrepreneurship.

==== Incubators, Accelerators, and Mentorship ====
Business incubators help entrepreneurs during the early stages of creating a business. They can provide things like legal and business assistance, an area to work and brainstorm ideas, and opportunities to connect with other like-minded entrepreneurs. A researcher examined 16 Swedish business incubators and found three main components of incubators: Selection, Business support, and mediation. Selection decides which startups can join the incubation. Business support provides assistance to help businesses grow and develop. Mediation is connecting startups with helpful organizations and resources to innovate and grow.

Researchers studied an incubator that supported entrepreneurs in South Africa. They experienced 22% higher revenue growth and 15% higher employment growth through the incubator. From 22 empirical studies, a meta-analysis found a statistically significant, but small, positive effect of incubator participation on startup performance. It identified that incubators do in fact have an effect on the success and growth of startup companies in the ecosystem.

Examining incubators in canada, digital technologies are shown to help incubators select businesses, create connections, and provide support. Technology was found to help incubators interact with other like minded people within the startup ecosystem.

Startup accelerators differ from incubators and other ways of boosting startup growth. They are short-term, structures startup programs to help accelerate startup company growth. There are fixed-duration programs that work with groups of startups within an ecosystem. Accelerators mainly focus on education, mentorship, and networking as central features. Accelerators differ in program design, services, and the types of startups they look for and recruit. Accelerators usually provide structured support over a timed period, on the other hand incubators can support early stage businesses over long periods. Accelerators focus on bringing mentors, investors, and other entrepreneurs into the picture with their founders.

An accelerator supporting entrepreneurs in Chile was researched. It was found that the additional education given to the startup founders improved venture performance, while just normal funding and workspace alone did not produce a detectable performance improvement. A study researching on if accelerators actually work compared startups admitted to accelerators with startups that came close to being admitted. It found that some accelerators substantially helped startups while others did not have the same benefits. Accelerators can help startups through business education and feedback, its not just about funding. However research shows results depend on how a program operates.

Accelerator entry can be associated with greater local funding and investments. Being in an accelerator does have an association to the amount of support toward growth a startup company receives. 21 primary studies were taken that found a overall positive relationship between accelerator participation and performance of startups. Accelerators can contribute to the startup ecosystem by bringing businesses and investors together.

Mentorship is a way of transferring entrepreneurial experience and knowledge. Mentorship can contribute to the professional development of newer entrepreneurs. It is a means of using someone close to you like a family member or business professional that you are close with to help guide you with your professional career. Mentors help founders access information and professional networks to advance their startup. personal advice and guidance is heavily used for founders in relation to their startup. Mentorship involves more experienced business professionals passing down advice to young, hungry founders.

Entrepreneurs assigned to higher ability mentors found 3.2% higher revenue and 3.5% higher profits one year after incubation.

===== Diversity and inclusion in startup ecosystems =====
Investors do not always evaluate startup founders the same way, even if their business ideas are similar. Research found that investors tended to ask male founders about growth and potential gains, where female founders were more often asked questions about potential risks and losses. We also learn that founders asked questions about growth tended to raise more funding.

Through this study we learned that differences in gender can affect the amount of funding you receive.

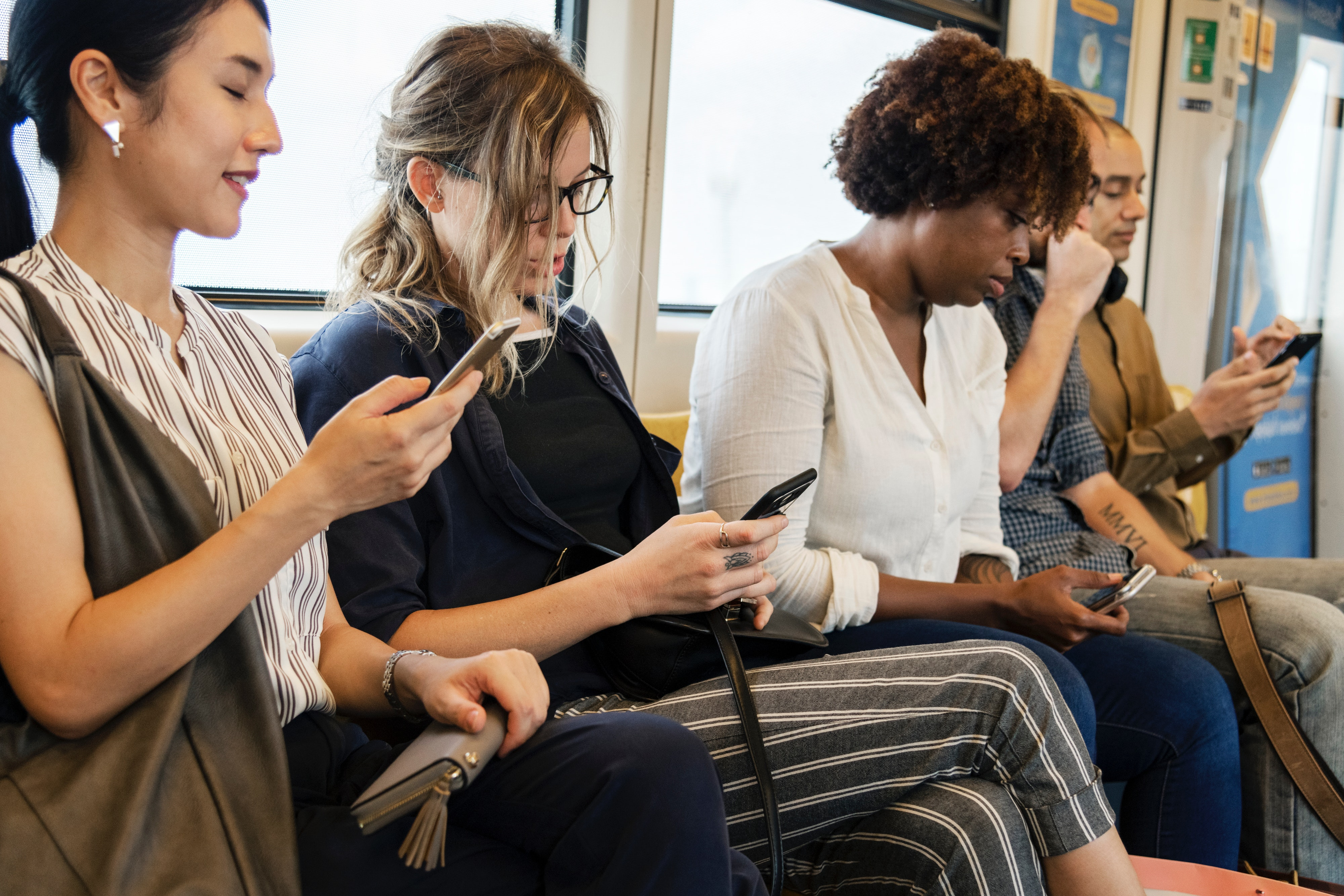

Research covering more than 160,000 US startup founders and investors stated only 3.1% of venture capital funded startups were black owned. Black owned startups raised about half as much venture capital as other startups. The findings depict that access to capital is not equal throughout race and gender. It tells the story that not every entrepreneur has the same opportunities within a startup ecosystem, and the background of a founder can affect their access to resources. Marx, Wang, and Yimfor found that venture capital investment in Black-founded startups increased after the racial justice movement in 2020. These findings show that some investors have made efforts to greater the inclusion within the startup ecosystem through including as many people as possible from different backgrounds.

Universities, investors, business programs, and other organizations are constantly working to open opportunities for founders who face difficulties. Ascend is a program led by the University of Washington that works across cities to support minority-owned and woman-owned businesses. The program focuses on early-stage business owners developing skills on running their company, connecting entrepreneurs with ways to obtain capital, and helping businesses compete for contracts with large organizations.

====== Government Support and Infrastructure ======
Governments can affect startup ecosystems by establishing policies, providing resources, and connecting organizations that support the ecosystem. There are four roles of the federal government within startup ecosystems.

Catalyst: Encouraging entrepreneurial and innovative activity.

Coordinator: Bringing together companies, universities, and other organizations to stimulate entrepreneurial growth.

Certifier: Helping verify the quality or credibility of a startup

Customer: the person that purchases goods and services from the business

The government is one participant within a large network of organizations. Its role can differ between different startup ecosystems. Research reviewed 99 articles about entrepreneurial ecosystem governance and found reoccurring themes like government support policies, network governance, ecosystem leadership, and the role of entrepreneurs in startup ecosystem activities.

Government grants can help startup firms and improve their ability to attract private investment. An early stage grant approximately doubled the probability that a firm subsequently received venture capital funding. there is a 20-30% higher likelihood of remaining in business four years later among grant receivers near the funding cutoff, compared with similar unsuccessful applicants.

Governments also influence entrepreneurship by investing in infrastructure, reliable internet access, and connecting with markets. Broadband availability was associated with increased new business activity. The research found eveidence of greater total business productivity. Reliable internet infrastructure can support new businesses being formed. Government investment in digital infrastructure can influence entrepreneurial activity by reducing barriers needed to start and function a business. Researchers investigated broadband expansion in Chinese cities and found it increased new firm registrations, and had an improvement in information exchange, and financial access.

== Global Startup ecosystem and ranking ==
Global startup ecosystems exist in cities and hubs around the world. Startup Genome publishes a yearly ranking of global startup ecosystems. They compare these ecosystems based on things like startup activity, funding, and business. The study does yearly reports ranking the top 40 global startup hubs. In addition, StartupBlink, also releases an annual Index ranking global startup ecosystems, which evaluates over 1,000 cities worldwide.

=== Top Cities in Startup Genome GSER 2024 ===
Rank	Change from 2025	Hub
1	Steady	(United States) San Francisco Bay
2	Steady	(United States) New York City
2	Steady	(United Kingdom) London
4	▲ (1)	(Israel) Tel Aviv
4	Steady	(United States) Los Angeles
6	Steady	(United States) Boston
7	▲ (1)	Singapore
8	▼ (1)	(China) Beijing
9	▲ (3)	(South Korea) Seoul
10	▲ (5)	(Japan) Tokyo
11	▼ (2)	(China) Shanghai
12	▼ (1)	(United States) Washington D.C
13	▲ (1)	(Netherlands) Amsterdam-Delta
14	▲ (4)	(France) Paris
15	▼ (1)	(Germany) Berlin
16	NA	(United States) Miami
17	▲ (2)	(United States) Chicago
18	▼ (1)	(Canada) Toronto-Waterloo
19	▼ (3)	(United States) San Diego
20	▼ (10)	(United States) Seattle

=== Africa ===
According to Startup Genome’s Global Startup Ecosystem Report 2025, Lagos, Nairobi and Cape Town are the three leading startup ecosystems in Sub-Saharan Africa. Lagos ranks first in the region for funding, Nairobi stands out for its strengths in fintech and agritech, while Cape Town leads in talent and knowledge.

=== Asia ===
According to the OECD, Asia has become the world's second-largest start-up ecosystem, accounting for 23% of global venture capital) investment between 2021 and 2023 and hosting 19% of the world's start-ups. These start-ups are primarily concentrated in sectors such as e-commerce, fintech and transport.

=== Latin America ===
In 2025, Latin America’s startup ecosystem was primarily concentrated in five major hubs: São Paulo, Mexico City, Bogotá, Buenos Aires and Santiago. These cities serve as regional hubs for entrepreneurship, investment and technological development. In the case of São Paulo, the city hosts approximately 21.7% of Brazil's total startups and is particularly strong in the SaaS and marketplace sectors.
