= The Founder Institute =

American business incubator and startup launch program

- Type: Corporation
- Industry: Business Incubator
- Founded: 2009
- Headquarters: Palo Alto, California
- Key people: Adeo Ressi (Co-Founder & CEO); Jonathan Greechan (Co-Founder)
- Website: fi.co

The Founder Institute is an American business incubator, entrepreneur training and startup launch program that was founded in Palo Alto, California in 2009. Based in Silicon Valley, The Founder Institute has chapters in over 200 cities in more than 100 countries. It offers a 14-weeks part-time program for new and early-stage entrepreneurs that helps them develop their business ideas and form a company. Among the key requirements for graduation is the incorporation of a legal entity by the end of the program. As of 2025, over 7,500 companies had been created from the program, which raised over $1.85BN funding in total.

== History ==
The Founder Institute was founded in 2009 by Adeo Ressi in his garage in Palo Alto, California. It was created with his friend and business partner Jonathan Greechan as a response to the 2008 financial crisis and the attendant failures of numerous startups. From the outset, its primary goal was to provide a safe place for companies to materialize and entrepreneurs to hone their skills. Ressi also wanted to "globalize Silicon Valley" and make entrepreneurial training available to people around the world. One of the earliest visions of The Founder Institute was to launch 1,000 companies per year. Graduates were given access to a "equity collective," where all participants in the program share equity in the companies formed. The first class graduated in October 2009 in Silicon Valley and was composed of 66 entrepreneurs and 54 companies.

By the middle of 2010, The Founder Institute had chapters in ten cities throughout the world, including New York City, San Diego, Berlin, and Singapore. In May 2010, the chapters in New York and D.C. graduated a total of 25 new startups. By the end of 2011, it had more than 20 locations worldwide and had graduated 483 entrepreneurs with 415 total companies. It also maintained around 700 mentors. In addition, The Founder Institute announced that it had become the "largest incubator in the world." Adeo Ressi started the Female Founder Fellowship program to help address the dearth of women in the tech industry. Women founders accounted for roughly 20% of all startups and graduates at The Founder Institute in 2011. By 2012, that percentage had increased to 36%.

In September 2012, The Founder Institute achieved a milestone of 650 startups graduating. It had also expanded its operations to 32 cities in 19 countries (including Vietnam, Mexico, and Israel). In 2013, it achieved another milestone with 1,000 startups created in roughly four years. Around 89% of those companies were still operational, and 74% of those were at or ahead of their prescribed growth plans.

In 2014, The Founder Institute moved to a new headquarters in downtown Palo Alto. It commemorated the move with a unicorn-themed party. By January 2025, The Founder Institute has programs in over 200 cities in over 100 countries worldwide and had been responsible for the creation of over 7,500 companies.

== Program ==
The program offered by The Founder Institute has been considered unique by comparison to other incubator programs. It is a 14-weeks program that recruits and accepts new and early-stage entrepreneurs who may still be full-time employed, and who don't necessarily yet have a fully formed idea or company. One of the key requirements for graduation is the incorporation of a company. Only around 40% of enrolled students end up graduating the program.

Another main feature of The Founder Institute's program is its global reach. Because of the large number of chapters throughout the world, more entrepreneurs can gain access to the training and networking. Each chapter has its own mentors, but the curriculum is similar amongst all locales. It only chooses mentors who are successful founders or CEOs in and of themselves. As of 2025, there is over 37,000 mentors in The Founder Institute network globally. Networking is another major component of the program, allowing entrepreneurs to communicate (often for the first time) with like-minded individuals in their region. Founders join an "equity collective" upon their entry to the program that rewards graduates, mentors, and local directors for the successes of their peers.

=== Predictive admissions test ===
The Founder Institute has an application process that requires a proprietary aptitude and personality test designed to identify "entrepreneurial personality traits." In 2010 it was reported that of those accepted after testing, 57% performed as predicted with 27% performing worse and 16% performing better than predicted. By 2013, more than 15,000 applicants had taken the test which resulted in accepted applicants who created 650 companies in 39 cities throughout five continents.

The test is reported to take approximately 1 hour, and measures aptitude, intelligence, and five psychological personality traits. All of this information is then reportedly cross-referenced with data from Institute graduates, and is used to compile a database that seeks to pinpoint the ideal score for a successful entrepreneur. The data continues being collected even after the students have graduated the program. For example, if a founder's company earns a liquidity event (IPO, sale, etc.), their scores will be increased. Applicants are given a score of 0 to 5, 5 being the highest, that helps predict how well the applicant will do as an entrepreneur. The test has been the feature of discussion in publications such as CNN Money, Tech Crunch, and Forbes.

== Curriculum ==
The curriculum of The Founder Institute is often taught sequentially. Throughout the 14-weeks program, founders are asked to work on their ideas, research their ideas, name their company and product, seek out co-founders, and work out a business model. The curriculum is guided by The Founder Institute, but taught by mentors with experience as startup founders and/or CEOs. The curriculum also uses a hands-on approach, often exposing students to situations that an entrepreneur would find themselves in. It creates working groups that combine 4 or 5 founders together. These groups meet several times each week to discuss the formation of their business plan. The curriculum is similar throughout all of the chapters, but sessions aren't universally conducted in English.

Mentors guide entrepreneurs through the program with training and feedback, and participate in the “shared equity pool”. Mentors in The Founder Institute have include Aaron Patzer and Phil Libin, both of whom have mentored at the Silicon Valley chapter. Additional mentors have included Robin Chase, Peter Vesterbacka, and Jeffrey Paine.

== Locations ==
As of 2025, The Founder Institute has chapters in over 200 cities and more than 100 countries on 6 continents. The founding chapter is located in Silicon Valley. Each chapter has its own local directors and mentors.

The Silicon Valley chapter is the oldest chapter in The Founder Institute system. Eren Bali, who graduated from the initial class, is one of the co-founders of the online educational marketplace, Udemy. The Berlin chapter was one of the first chapters to come to Europe The Singapore chapter was launched in 2010 and is one of the most successful chapters of The Founder Institute in Asia.

== Notable companies ==
As of 2014, The Founder Institute has produced around 1,300 companies and graduates throughout its existence, including Udemy, Kindara, and Zirtual.
