= Goat Island =

Goat Island (or Goat Islands) may refer to:

== Places ==
=== Australia ===
- Goat Island (Port Jackson), Sydney Harbour, New South Wales
- Goat Island (Tasmania), a small unpopulated granite island in the Bass Strait
- Several islands within the Murray River in South Australia, including:
  - Goat Island (Paringa) Goat Island, within the Murray River National Park in the Riverland of South Australia

=== Canada ===
- Goat Island, one of the Little Bay Islands in Newfoundland and Labrador
- Goat Island (British Columbia)
- Goat Island (Ontario)

=== Ireland ===
- Goat Island (Ardmore) in County Waterford

=== Marshall Islands ===
- Goat Island in Wotje Atoll in the Marshall Islands

=== New Zealand ===
- Goat Island / Rakiriri, Otago Harbour, Dunedin, South Island
- Mahurangi Island (Goat Island), at the Coromandel Peninsula, North Island
- Mapoutahi, formerly known as Goat Island, a peninsula near Waitati in Otago, on the South Island's east coast
- Takangaroa Island, formerly known as Goat Island, part of the Mayne Islands in the western reaches of the Hauraki Gulf / Tīkapa Moana
- Goat Island (Auckland), North of Auckland, North Island

=== Trinidad and Tobago ===
- Goat Island (Trinidad and Tobago), a small island off the coast of Little Tobago

=== United Kingdom ===
- Goat Island (County Fermanagh), a townland in County Fermanagh, Northern Ireland

=== United States ===
- Goat Island (Solano County), California
- Goat Island, former official name of Yerba Buena Island in San Francisco Bay, California
- Goat Island (Connecticut)
- Goat Island (Hawaii)
- Goat Island (Maine), see Goat Island Light
- Goat Island (Maryland) - see list of islands of Maryland
- Goat Island (Michigan)
- Goat Island (New York), in the middle of Niagara Falls
- Goat Island (Clackamas County, Oregon)
- Goat Island (Columbia County, Oregon)
- Goat Island (Curry County, Oregon)
- Goat Island, Harris Beach State Park, Oregon
- Goat Island (Rhode Island)
- Goat Island (South Carolina)
- Goat Island (Lake Wylie), South Carolina
- Goat Island (Brown County, Texas)
- Goat Island (Galveston County, Texas)
- Goat Island (Stephens County, Texas)
- Goat Island (Tarrant County, Texas)
- Goat Island, the nickname for Aguigan, Northern Mariana Islands

=== Vanuatu ===
- Goat Island, name variant of Vete Manung (Île de la Chèvre)

== Other uses ==
- Goat Island Mountain, Washington State, United States
- Goat Island (performance group), a Chicago-based company
- Goat Island Light, Cape Porpoise, Maine, United States

== See also ==
- Goat Island Formation, Appalachian Basin; a geologic formation
- Great Goat Island, Jamaica
- Little Goat Island, Jamaica
- Cabras Islets or Little Goat Islands, Azores, Portugal
