= List of islands of Texas =

This is an incomplete list of islands of Texas. Most of Texas' islands are small, unnamed and uninhabited and could not be listed.

- Alcatraz
- Alexander Island
- Atkinson Island (Chambers County)
- Bayucos Island
- Bird Island (Chambers County)
- Blackberry Island
- Brazos Island
- Buck Nekkid Island (Burleson County)
- Buckeye Island (Chambers County)
- Clark Island
- Clear Lake Shores (Galveston County)
- Cove Island (Chambers County)
- Coulter Island (Chambers County)
- Coyote Island
- Dagger Island
- Dewberry Island
- Galveston Island
- Goat Island (Galveston County)
- Goat Island (Tarrant County)
- Grass Island
- Hannah Island
- Horse Island (Chambers County)
- Ingleside Point
- Lawrence Island' (Chambers County)
- Leat Island (Chambers County)
- Long Island (Calhoun County)
- Long Island (Cameron County)
- Marriage Island
- Matagorda Island
- Mud Island (Aransas County)
- Mud Island (Brazoria County)
- Mustang Island
- North Deer Island
- North Padre Island
- Padre Island
- Pelican Island (Corpus Christi)
- Pelican Island (Galveston, Texas)
- Pelone Island
- Pine Island
- Pleasure Island
- Port Aransas
- Red Fish Island
- 14-block area surrounded by the San Antonio River and the San Antonio River Walk in San Antonio
- San José Island
- Shamrock Island
- Skimmer Key
- South Padre Island
- Spoil Banks
- Sunny Buns Island (Washington County)
- Tres Marais Island
- Turkey Island
- Turnstake Island
- Twin Island
- Ultimo Island
- Vanderveer Island
- Vingt-et-un Islands
- Walton Island
- Ward Island
- Watts Island
- Wood Island
- Yucca Island
