= Jamaican dry forests =

Ecoregion in Jamaica

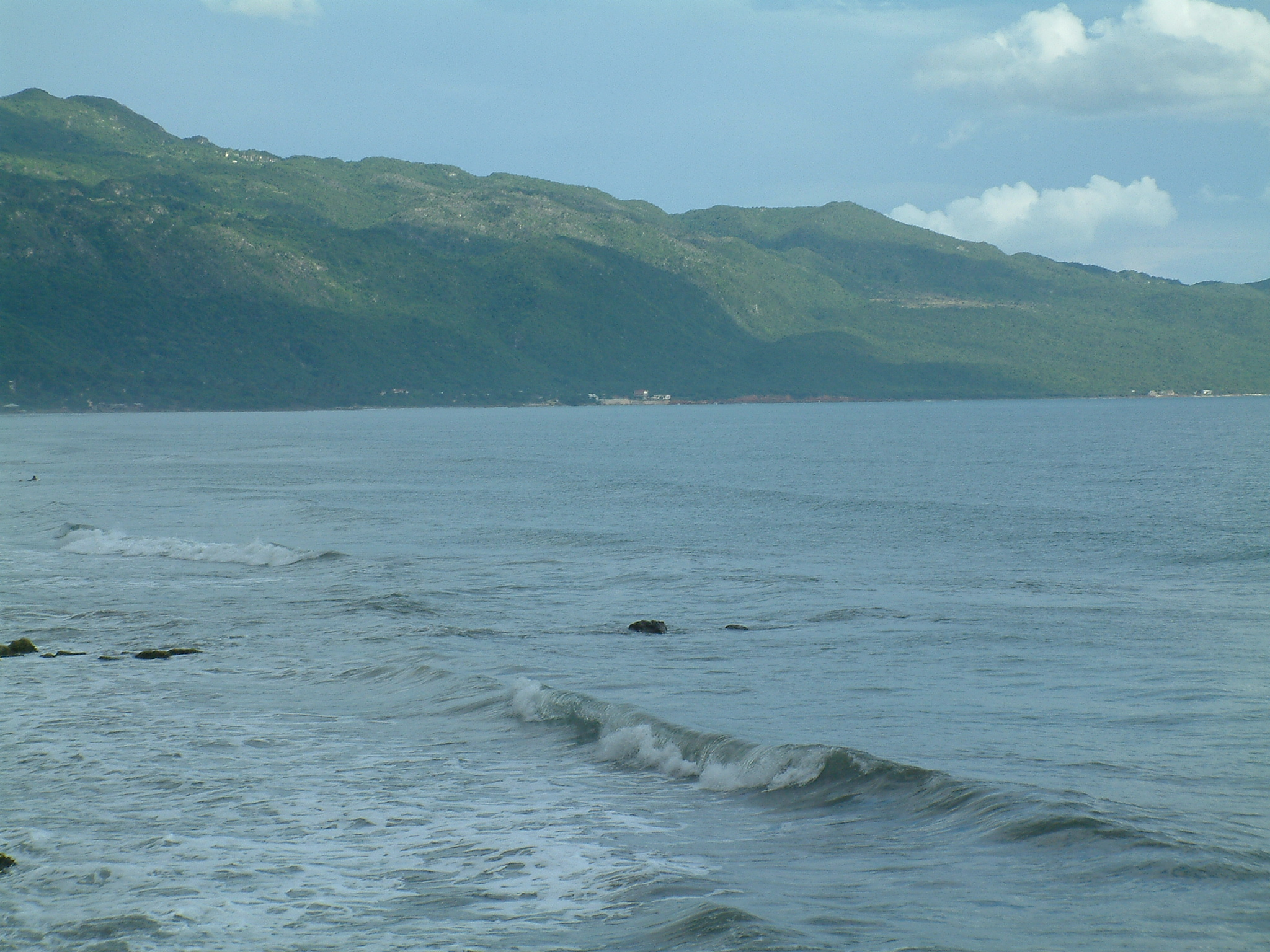
- Hills above Alligator Pond, Jamaica

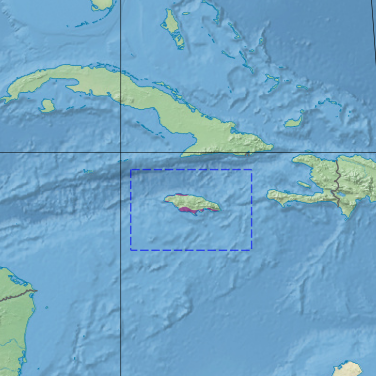
- Ecoregion territory (in purple)

Ecology
- Realm: Neotropical
- Biome: tropical and subtropical dry broadleaf forests
- Borders: Jamaican moist forests

Geography
- Area: 2,255 km^{2} (871 mi^{2})
- Country: Jamaica

Conservation
- Conservation status: Critical/Endangered
- Protected: 459 km^{2} (20%)

The Jamaican dry forests is a tropical dry forest ecoregion located in southern Jamaica.

== Geography ==
The ecoregion covers three discontinuous areas of Jamaica. The largest area extends along the south coast of the island, from Morant Point, Jamaica's easternmost point, to Black River Bay in the west. Kingston, Jamaica's capital and largest city, is in the ecoregion. Smaller areas of dry forest occur around Negril at the western end of the island, and east of Montego Bay along the island's northern shore.

The most extensive dry forests are in the limestone hills of the Hellshire Hills in Saint Catherine Parish and Portland Ridge in Clarendon Parish in southern Jamaica. These areas are dry because they lie in the orographic rain shadow of the Blue Mountains. The Hellshire Hills have been described as one of the last substantial areas of primary, undisturbed dry forest in the Caribbean. Much of the remaining Jamaican dry forest lies within the Portland Bight Protected Area which includes the Portland Ridge and the Hellshire Hills, which are the best-studied areas of Jamaican dry forest.

== Flora ==
The Jamaican dry forests are dominated by plants in the Rubiaceae, the Euphorbiaceae and the Myrtaceae. In this regard they are similar to Puerto Rican dry forests, but differ sharply from dry forests on the mainland of South and Central America which are dominated by the Fabaceae and the Bignoniaceae. Over 271 plant species have been reported from the Hellshire Hills, including 53 species endemic to Jamaica. McLaren and coauthors (2005) found forests in the Hellshire Hills to be dominated by Drypetes lateriflora, Metopium brownei, Bauhinia divaricata and Krugiodendron ferreum.

== Fauna ==
The endangered Jamaican iguana (Cyclura collei) is restricted to dry forests in the Hellshire Hills. The endemic tree frog Eleutherodactylus cavernicola, two endemic thunder snakes, Tropidophis stullae and Tropidophis jamaicensis, and the endemic blue-tailed galliwasp (Celestus duquesneyi) are restricted to the Portland Ridge. Other endemic species present in the area include the Jamaican boa (Chilabothrus subflavus), the common snake (Typhlops jamaicensis), the Jamaican red groundsnake (Hypsirhynchus callilaemus), the Jamaican coney (Geocapromys brownii) and 11 endemic subspecies of birds. The last Jamaican populations of the skink Mabuya mabouya are believed to be in the Hellshire Hills.
