= Dell Technologies =

American multinational technology company

Dell Technologies Inc.

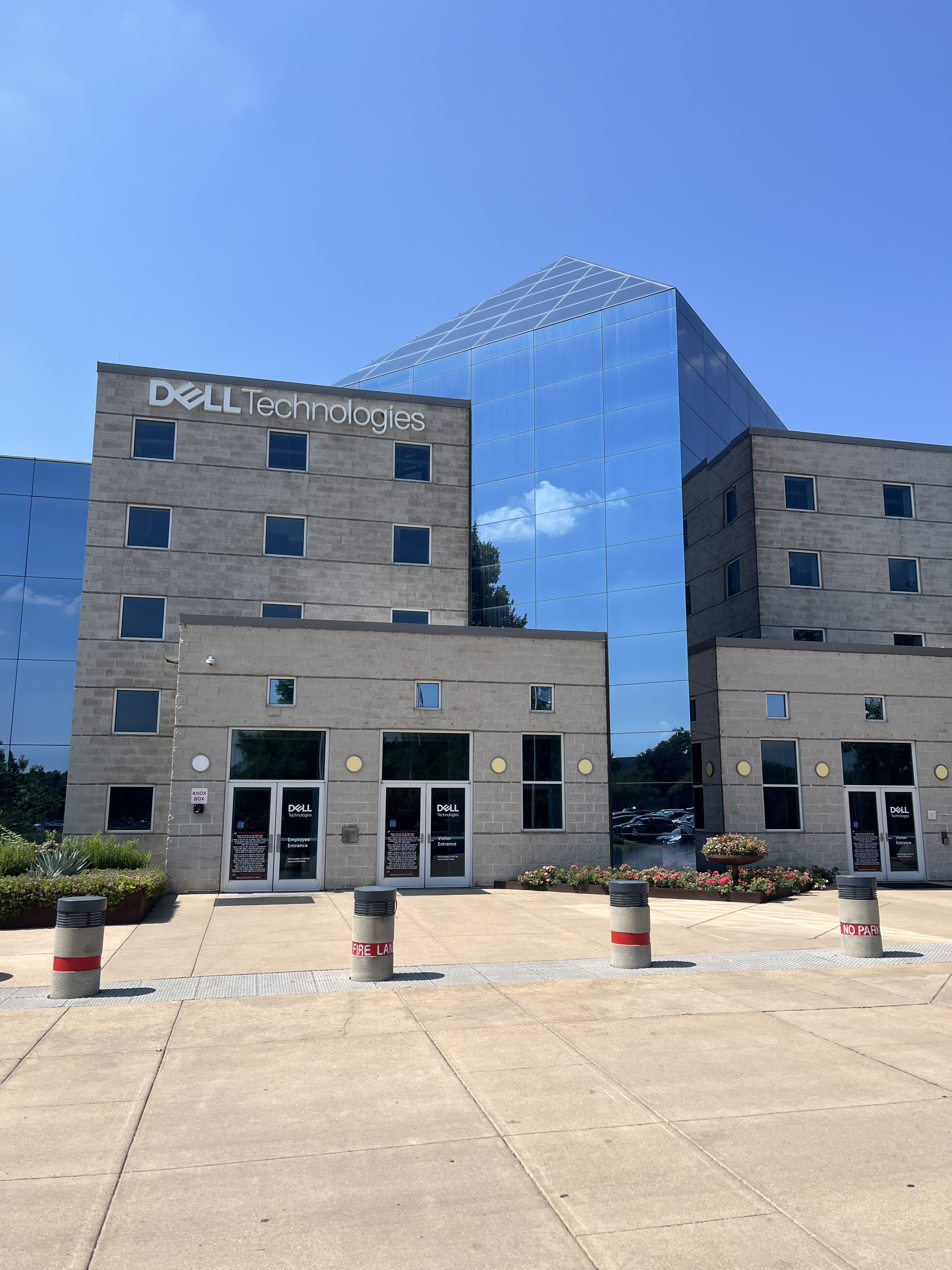
- Headquarters in Round Rock, Texas
- Type: Public
- Traded as: NYSE: DELL (Class C); S&P 100 component; S&P 500 component
- Industry: Information technology
- Predecessors: Dell Inc.; EMC Corporation
- Founded: September 7, 2016; 10 years ago
- Founder: Michael Dell
- Headquarters: Round Rock, Texas, U.S.
- Area served: Worldwide
- Key people: Michael Dell (chairman and CEO); Jeff Clarke (vice chairman and COO)
- Products: Personal computers; Servers; Data storage devices; Networking switches; Computer software; Monitors & peripherals
- Services: Cloud computing; Information security; IT consulting; Managed services; Corporate venture capital
- Revenue: ▲US$113.5 billion (2026)
- Operating income: ▲US$8.149 billion (2026)
- Net income: ▲US$5.936 billion (2026)
- Total assets: ▲US$101.3 billion (2026)
- Total equity: ▼US$–2.47 billion (2026)
- Owner: Michael Dell (58.9%)
- Number of employees: c. 97,000 (2026)
- Divisions: Client Solutions Group; Infrastructure Solutions Group
- Subsidiaries: Alienware; Virtustream
- Website: dell.com
- Footnotes; Financials as of January 30, 2026.

Dell Technologies Inc. is an American multinational technology company that has been headquartered in Round Rock, Texas, since 1994. It was formed as a result of the September 2016 merger of Dell Inc. and EMC Corporation. Dell Technologies ranked 44th on the 2025 Fortune 500 rankings of the largest United States corporations based on its 2024 revenue; its products include personal computers, servers, monitors, computer software, computer security and network security, as well as information security services.

== History ==
=== Founding ===
Dell–EMC merger wordmark introduced in 2016

In 2013 Dell Inc. had returned to private ownership, claiming that it faced bleak prospects and would need several years out of the public eye to rebuild its business. In the same time period, EMC Corporation, an enterprise software and storage company, was being pressured by Elliott Management Corporation, a hedge fund holding 2.2% of EMC's stock, to reorganize the unusual "Federation" structure, in which EMC's divisions were effectively being run as independent companies. Elliott argued that this structure deeply undervalued EMC's core "EMC II" data storage business, and that increasing competition between EMC II and VMware products was confusing the market and hindering both companies.

On October 12, 2015, Dell announced its intention to acquire EMC in a $67 billion transaction. It was to be the largest acquisition in technology sector history, and was backed by major Dell shareholders Michael Dell, Temasek Holdings, and Silver Lake Partners. On the same day as the announcement, the Wall Street Journal estimated that in 2014 Dell had held revenue of $27.3 billion from personal computers and $8.9 billion from servers, while EMC had held $16.5 billion from EMC II, $1bn from RSA Security, $6bn from VMware, and $230 million from Pivotal Software.

The combined business was expected to address the markets for scale-out architecture, converged infrastructure and private cloud computing, playing to the strengths of both EMC and Dell. Commentators questioned the deal, with FBR Capital Markets saying that though it makes a "ton of sense" for Dell, it was a "nightmare scenario that would lack strategic synergies" for EMC. Fortune said there was a lot for Dell to like in EMC's portfolio, but "does it all add up enough to justify tens of billions of dollars for the entire package? Probably not." The Register reported the view of William Blair & Company that the merger would "blow up the current IT chess board", forcing other IT infrastructure vendors to restructure to achieve scale and vertical integration. The value of VMware stock fell 10% after the announcement, valuing the deal at around $63–64bn rather than the $67bn originally reported.

The deal was closed on September 7, 2016, and saw EMC rebranded Dell EMC, and the creation of a new parent company, Dell Technologies Inc., which consisted of three main business divisions — the Client Solutions Group, managed by Dell Inc., Infrastructure Solutions Group, managed by Dell EMC, and VMware. The merger involved the issuance by Dell of $45.9 billion in new debt, and $4.4 billion of privately placed common stock. EMC had owned 81% of the stock of VMware. The acquisition maintained VMware as a separate company, held via a new tracking stock, whilst the rest of EMC was rolled into Dell. Dell paid $24.05 per share of EMC, and $9.05 per share of tracking stock in VMware. The acquisition required Dell to publish quarterly financial results, having ceased these on going private in 2013. Subsequently, Dell Services, Dell Software Group, and the Dell EMC Enterprise Content Division, were sold shortly thereafter for proceeds of $7.0 billion, which was used to repay debt.

=== Going public ===
On January 29, 2018, it was reported that Dell Technologies was considering a reverse merger with its VMware subsidiary to take the company public. In July, Dell announced intentions to pay $21.7 billion in both cash and stock. Originally, in a deal described as "aggressive", $9 billion in cash was to be pulled from VMware to buy shareholders out of their tracking stock. This offered shareholders 60 cents on the dollar. In November, Carl Icahn (who owned 9.3% of Dell) sued the company over the deal. As a result of this pressure from Icahn and other activist investors, the deal was renegotiated, ultimately offering shareholders 80 cents on the dollar ($14 billion total). On December 28, 2018, Dell Technologies Inc. became a public company, with the VMware share buyback enabling them to bypass the traditional IPO process.

On April 15, 2021, it was reported that Dell Technologies would spin out the remainder of its VMware shares to shareholders. The two companies would continue to operate without major changes for at least five years.

=== Investments ===
On November 19, 2015, Dell, alongside Arm Holdings, Cisco Systems, Intel, Microsoft, and Princeton University, founded the OpenFog Consortium, to promote interests and development in fog computing.

In October 2017, It was reported that $1 billion would be invested in IoT research and development.

In 2018, Dell had a racing partnership with British racing team McLaren, providing processing power to support the large amounts of racing data generated by McLaren's Formula 1 program.

In February 18, 2020, Dell announced their intention to sell RSA Security (acquired in the EMC merger) for $2.075 billion to Symphony Technology Group. In anticipation of the sale, Dell Technologies made the strategic decision to retain the BSAFE product line. RSA transferred BSAFE products (including the Data Protection Manager product) and customer agreements, including maintenance and support, to Dell Technologies on July 1st, 2020. On September 1, 2020, the sale was completed.

In February 2025, Dell sold Secureworks to British cybersecurity vendor Sophos. In December 2025, Dell acquired Israeli data infrastructure startup Dataloop for $120 million in an all cash deal. In 2026, the Pentagon awarded a five-year, $9.7 billion contract to Dell to provide software to the U.S. military. The contract's timing came after Dell founder Michael Dell pledged $6.25 billion toward investment accounts for children, titled, "Trump accounts.” The decision was also made just after Trump had bought millions of dollars worth of stock in Dell. In May 2026, OpenAI partnered with Dell Technologies to allow enterprise customers to deploy the AI coding assistant Codex in on-premises and hybrid environments, integrating directly with the Dell AI Data Platform.

== Business ==
Dell Technologies has products and services in the field of scale-out architecture, converged infrastructure, private cloud computing, and edge computing.

Dell operates under two divisions:

- Dell Inc., which includes the Client Solutions Group (55.3% of fiscal 2024 revenues), which produces desktop PCs, notebooks, tablets, and peripherals, such as monitors, printers, and projectors
- Dell EMC, which includes the Infrastructure Solutions Group (38.3% of fiscal 2024 revenues), which produces servers, storage, and networking

== Finances ==
In January 2021, Dell reported $94 billion (equivalent to $1.1003×10^{11} in 2025) in sales and $13 billion (equivalent to $1.522×10^{10} in 2025) operating cash flow during 2020.

By June 2021, Dell Technologies' stock price had reached an all-time high of over US$100 per share, reflecting the company's successful transition to a technology service provider that helps customers navigate digital transformation.

On March 1, 2024, Dell Technologies' stock hit all-time high after earnings. It delivered a strong performance from its artificial intelligence unit that sent shares up nearly 40%, its highest daily gain since the company went public in 2018.

In August 2024, the company announced it would be laying off 12,500 employees—10% of its workforce—in order to invest in artificial intelligence initiatives.
