= Redfish (disambiguation) =

Redfish is a common name for several species of fish.

Redish or Red Fish may also refer to:

== Places ==
- Red Fish Island, in island in Galveston Texas
- Redfish Bay, an extension of Aransas Bay in Texas
- Redfish Lake, an alpine lake in central Idaho
- Redfish Pass, a strait in Florida

== Other ==
- Red Fish, a 2003 album by the band The Moondogs
- Red Fish (Oglala), a Native American chief in the 1840s
- Redfish (specification), an Internet protocol
- Redfish (website), a subsidiary of the Russian state-owned video news agency Ruptly

== See also ==
- Red Fisher (disambiguation)
