= DCMI =

DCMI may refer to:

- Double crossover merging interchange, a proposed type of road interchange
- Dublin Core Metadata Initiative, the organization responsible for maintaining the Dublin Core metadata standard
- Data Center Manageability Interface, a technical specification first published by Intel in 2008
