= MegaRAC =

The MegaRAC from American Megatrends is a product line of baseboard management controller (BMC) firmware packages and formerly Service Processors providing complete Out-of-band, or Lights-out remote management of computer systems independently of the operating system status or location to troubleshoot computers and assure continuity of service. MegaRAC Service Processors came in various formats - PCI cards, embedded modules and software-only.

== History ==
The MegaRAC remote management controller was introduced in 1998 for Dell, that later developed the DRAC. The second generation card, MegaRACG2 (2002), provided console, KVM graphical redirection, firewall, and battery backup.

== Products ==
AMI currently offers three MegaRAC packages: MegaRAC OneTree, AMI's latest BMC firmware package that is based on OpenBMC; MegaRAC SP-X, an earlier BMC firmware package that is based on Linux; and MegaRAC CommunityEdition, an open source BMC firmware package that is based on OpenBMC.

== MegaRAC SP Firmware ==
The MegaRAC SP firmware is composed of four major functionality groups:

- Complete IPMI 2.0 implementation, providing sensor and health monitoring, alerting, event logging serial over LAN, and so on. This firmware utilizes Linux 2.6.
- Virtual KVM for redirection of Video, Keyboard and Mouse signals. This uses AMI's proprietary compression technology.
- Virtual Media for redirection of CD/DVD. This is used to utilize a local CD/DVD to install an operating system or software on a remote host.
- DMTF compliant management infrastructure, implementing CIM, SMASH and WS-MAN.

The MegaRAC SP firmware is marketed to Original Equipment Manufacturers (OEMs), not end-users.
