= Great Goat Island =

Island off the coast of Jamaica

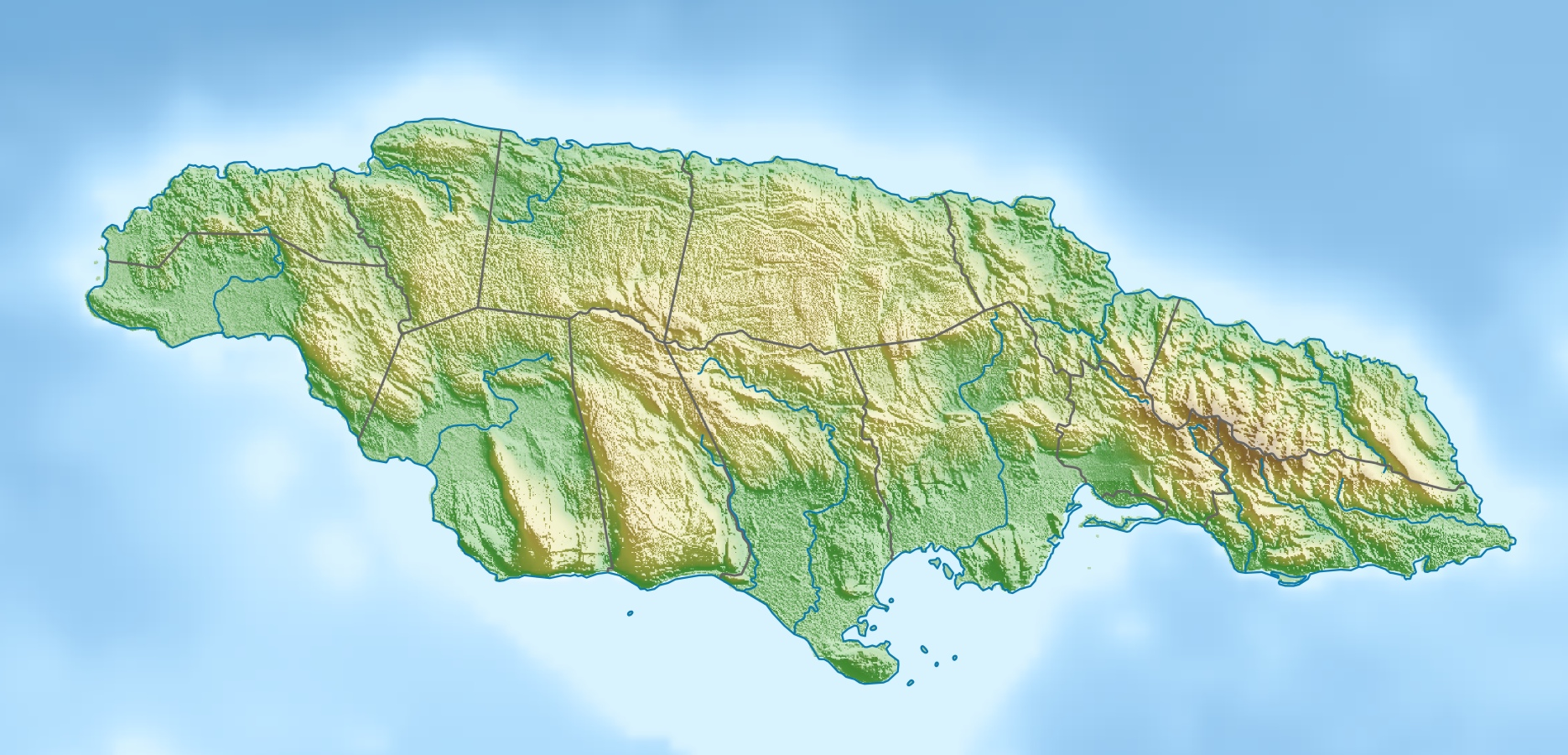
- Location within Jamaica Location within the Caribbean

Geography
- Location: Caribbean
- Coordinates: 17°52′N 77°03′W

Administration
- Jamaica
- Parish: Saint Catherine Parish

Great Goat Island is a cay located less than a mile off the coast of Jamaica, southwest of the Hellshire Hills. It is part of Saint Catherine Parish. Along with Little Goat Island located northwest of it, these two cays make up the Goat Islands, which are within the Portland Bight Protected Area.

The Spanish, who occupied Jamaica from the fifteenth century, used the Goat Islands as a part of their defence system:

"Don Fernando Melgarejo deCordova, Your Governor of the island of Jamaica,... On the 15th March [1598] after having driven from the port a hulk and tender of corsairs, he had information that they were three leagues outside the port at a Cay called "The Goats", and crews from the vessels, on the shore cutting Brazil wood and loading it. He went personally in two boats to disembark in some mangrove thickets and swamps, because the port was occupied, and so as not to be detected he went at midnight and supplied the people, at his own expense, with arms and munitions and provisions; and, in an ambuscade that he made, he captured and killed many with great risk to his person on account of the pieces of artillery they discharged."

According to the records of Jamaican land grants and patents, the cays were in the hands of private owners for several centuries after the arrival of the English in the 17th century. Most notable of these was Sir Thomas Lynch, a governor of Jamaica, who owned the islands from 1682-1684.

According to the Morning Journal, April 16, 1838: "All that valuable and extensive run of land, called Great Goat Island, containing about 1,500 acres, all in heavy wood, upwards of 30 years growth. The above run of land not only abounds in the best hardwood timbers, but also a great quantity of limestone of superior quality; and as a fishing station, Spanish Town and its vicinity is chiefly and abundantly supplied there from."

During WWII, an agreement between the UK and the US saw the islands converted to a US naval and air base.

These cays were previously home to the Jamaican Iguana until the 1940s, when the population was thought to have become extinct, mainly due to predation by introduced small Indian mongooses and habitat alteration by feral goats.

The island, as of September 2013, was being considered as the base for a Chinese funded transhipment hub. Since then the Jamaican government has committed to establish the Goat Islands as a conservation sanctuary.
