= Movenda =

- Founded: 1999
- Headquarters: Movenda, Via Pian di Scò 82 00139, Rome, Italy
- Products: Software products for Device & SIMCard Remote Management
- Website: www.movenda.com

Movenda is a company that provides software products for Device & SIMCard Remote Management. Movenda works for mobile operators, Handset and SIMCard manufacturers, and mobile virtual network operators to accelerate the adoption of new technologies and services. The company is heavily involved in the mobile sector.

Movenda was founded in 1999, and is headquartered in Rome, Italy. Telecom Italia is a Movenda minority shareholder.

== Product Lines ==
- SIMCard: Smart Card Web Server management, SIMCard OTA management, SIMCard quality testing.

Movenda has developed an SCWS management platform that allows one to configure and manage a web portal resident on a USIM card remotely, thanks to a web server running internally that allows the Mobile network operator to implement Value-added services.

- Mobile Phones: OMA device management and client provisioning, OMA firmware OTA, Android and iPhone customized applications.
- Mobile Content: delivery and protection.
