= IWM =

IWM may refer to:

- Imperial War Museum, British national museum organisation
- Information Warfare Monitor
- iShares Russell 2000 Index, with the NYSE Arca symbol IWM
- Integrated Woz Machine, Apple computer floppy drives
- Intelligent workload management of computing resources
- International Woman Master, now Woman International Master, chess titles
- Institut für die Wissenschaften vom Menschen ("Institute for human sciences") (IWM)
