= IT infrastructure =

Set of information technology components that are the foundation of an IT service

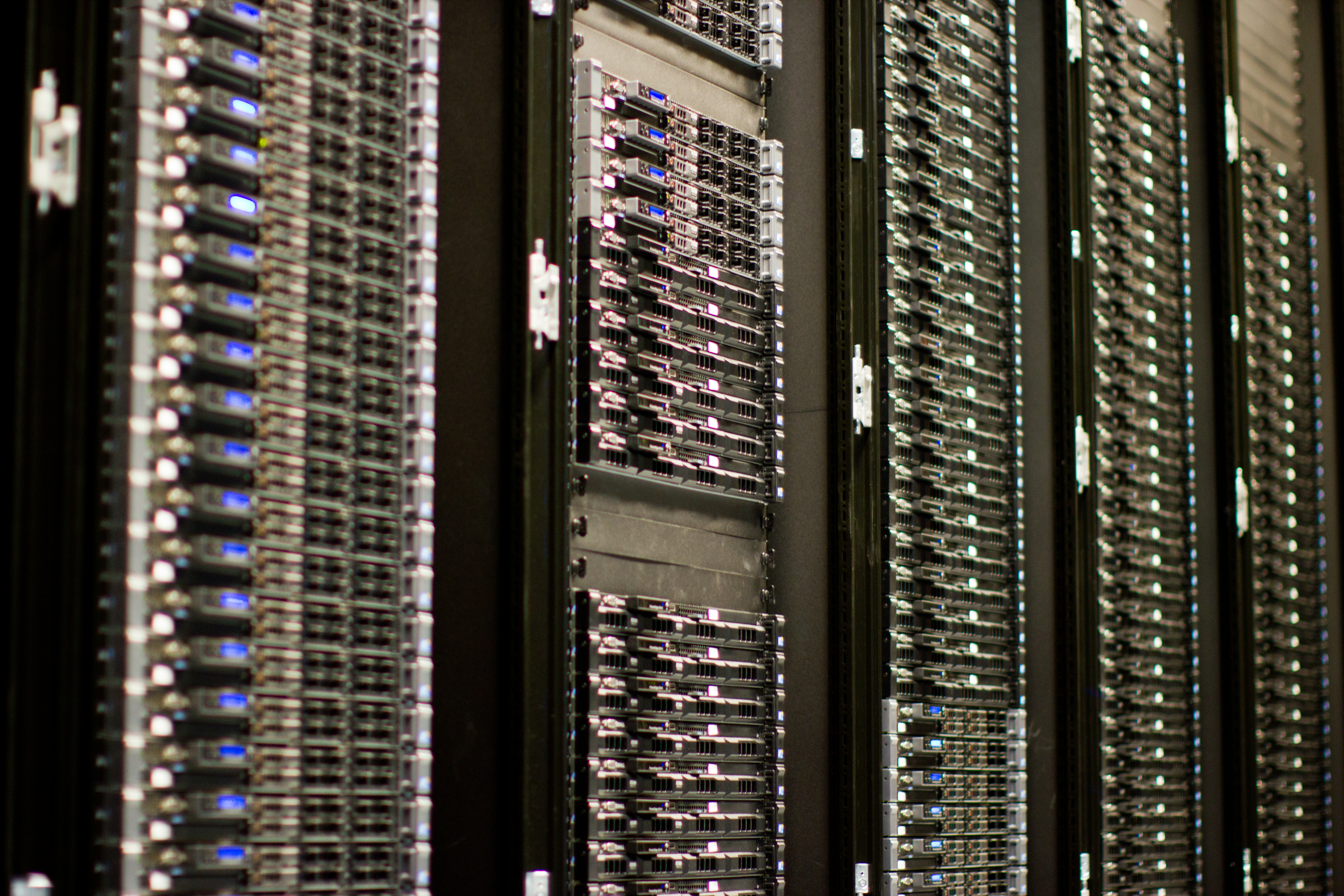
A server is a physical component of IT infrastructure.

Information technology infrastructure is broadly defined as a set of information technology (IT) components that are the foundation of an IT service; typically, these include physical components (computer and networking hardware and facilities) but also various software and network components.

According to the ITIL Foundation Course Glossary, IT infrastructure can also be defined as "all of the hardware, software, networks, facilities, etc., that are required to develop, test, deliver, monitor, control or support IT services." IT infrastructure hardware includes mainframe computers, end-user devices like personal computers (PCs), laptops and tablets, and networking hardware like firewalls and routers. The software components include operating systems (OS), database management systems (DBMS), and virtualization software.

== Overview ==
IT infrastructure contributes to and drives business functions. Leaders and managers within the IT field are responsible for ensuring that both physical hardware and software networks and resources are working optimally. IT infrastructure is the foundation of an organization's technology systems, and is thereby integral to its success. Organizations that rely on technology can benefit from having robust, interconnected IT infrastructure.

With the current speed at which technology changes and the competitive nature of businesses, IT leaders have to ensure their IT infrastructure is designed such that changes can be made quickly and without impacting business continuity. While traditionally companies tended to rely on physical data centers or colocation facilities to support their IT infrastructure, cloud hosting has become more popular as it is easier to manage and scale.

IT infrastructure can be managed by the company itself, or it can be outsourced to another company with consulting expertise in developing IT infrastructure. With advances in online outreach availability, it has become easier for end users to access technology. As a result, IT infrastructures have become more complex, and therefore it is harder for managers to oversee the end to end operations. To mitigate this issue, strong IT infrastructures require employees with varying skill sets. The fields of IT management and IT service management rely on IT infrastructure, and the ITIL framework was developed as a set of best practices with regard to IT infrastructure. The ITIL framework assists companies in being responsive to technological market demands. Technology may be thought of as an innovative product that can incur high production costs. However, the ITIL framework helps address these issues and allows a company to be more cost effective, which helps IT managers keep the IT infrastructure functioning.

=== Background ===
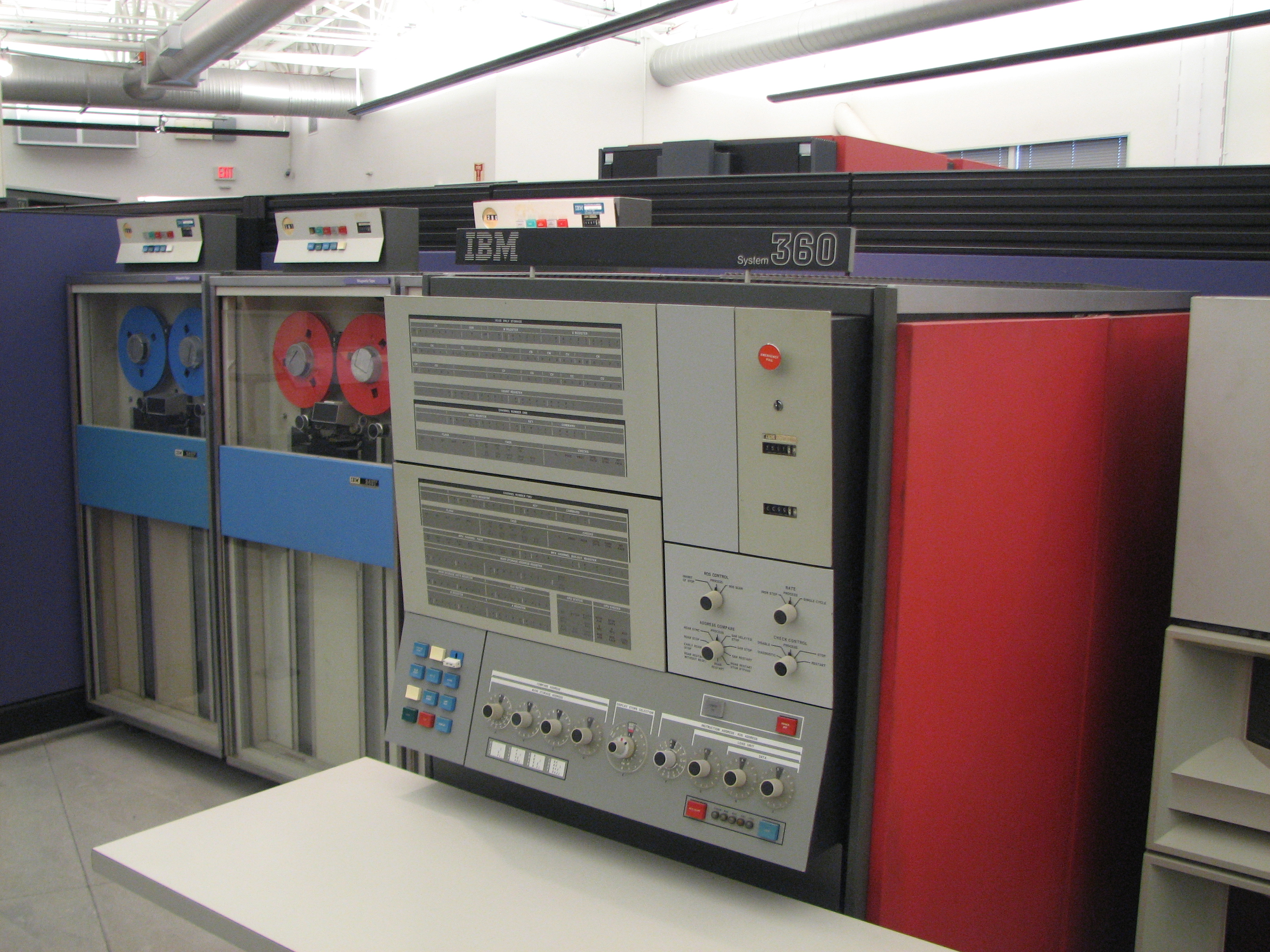
IBM System360 Mainframe, the first modern mainframe.

The history of IT infrastructure began in the mid-1950s, when mainframe computers were invented by IBM and other technology companies. They were designed to be able to process huge amounts of data at very quick speeds, and are still being used by many companies, banks, and government agencies. By the 1960s, the IBM System/360 mainframe became the standard. It was the first mainframe computer to introduce compatibility across systems, making it possible for applications created on one computer to operate on another.

Although IT infrastructure has existed for 60 years, there have been significant advancements in technology in the past 20 years. By the 2000s, companies began moving to cloud computing, turning IT infrastructure virtual. This changed how organizations used IT resources. Instead of being bound by the limitations of hardware IT, companies now only needed an internet connection to access IT services.

=== Components of IT infrastructure ===
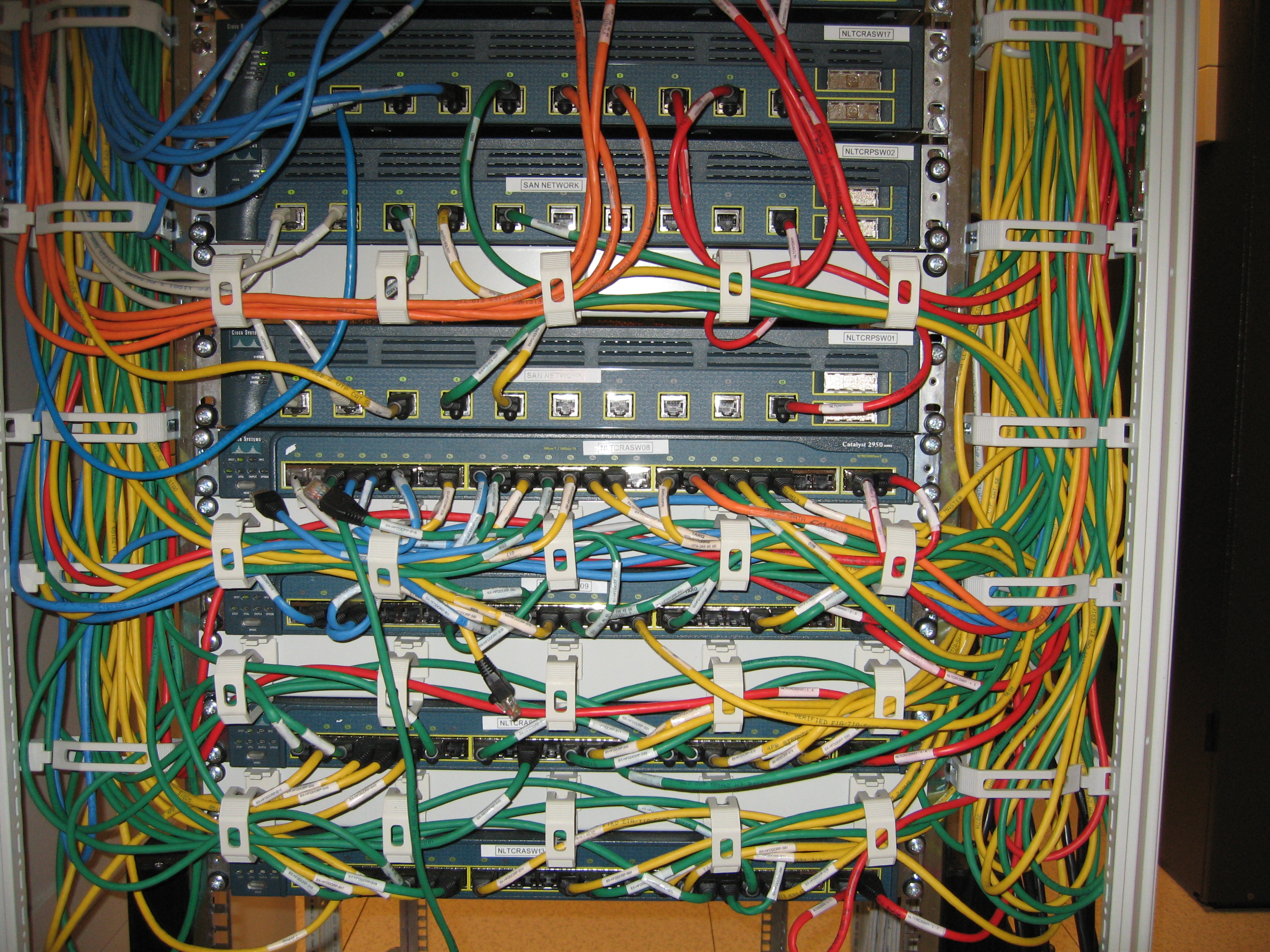
Network switch

The primary components of IT infrastructure are the physical systems, such as hardware, storage, any kind of routers/switches, and the building itself, along with networks and software. In addition to these components, "IT infrastructure security" is necessary to keep the network and its devices safe and maintain the integrity of the overall infrastructure of the organization.

IT infrastructure consists of three layers. The physical layer serves as the fundamental layer for hardware. The second and third layers (data link and network, respectively) are essential for communication to and from hardware devices. Without this, networking is not possible, and thus the internet itself would not be possible. Fiber optics play a crucial role in a network's infrastructure. They serve as the primary means for connecting network equipment and establishing connections between buildings.

=== Skills for IT personnel ===
In the field of IT infrastructure, key skills include technical abilities such as cloud, network, and data administration skills, as well as soft abilities, like collaboration and communication skills.

=== The future of IT infrastructure ===
As data storage and management becomes more digitized, IT infrastructure is moving toward the cloud. Infrastructure-as-a-service (IaaS) provides the ability to host on a server and is a platform for cloud computing.

== See also ==
- Converged infrastructure
- Cyber infrastructure
- Dynamic infrastructure
- Hyper-converged infrastructure
- Information infrastructure
- Event management (ITIL)
- Infrastructure as a service
- Infrastructure as code
- Software-defined infrastructure

== Sources ==
- Simon, Errol (1996). Distributed information systems: from client/server to distributed multimedia. McGraw-Hill. ISBN 9780077090760.
- Laan, Sjaak (2011). IT Infrastructure Architecture: Infrastructure Building Blocks and Concepts. Lulu Press. ISBN 9781447881285.
- van der Veen, Annelies; van Bon, Jan (2007). Foundations of ITIL V3. Van Haren Publishing. ISBN 978-90-8753-057-0.
- Rouse, Margaret (2017). "A DevOps primer: Start, improve and extend your DevOps teams", "TechTarget Search Data Center". Retrieved 28 September 2019.
- Laudon, Kenneth C., and Jane P. Laudon. Essentials of MIS. 14th ed., Pearson, 2020.
- Hedia Zardi, Walid Karamti, Thuraya Alwehaid, Shahad Almisned, Wajd Alsalloum, The Evolution of Cloud Computing Architectures: International Journal of Cloud Applications and Computing, Volume 15, Issue 1,2025, ISSN 2156-1834, https://doi.org/10.4018/IJCAC.391348.
