= PBPA =

PBPA may refer to:

- People Before Profit Alliance, an Irish political party formed in October 2005
- Portland Bight Protected Area, a protected environment of Jamaica
