= Composable disaggregated infrastructure =

Data centers gain benefits of cloud computing with on-premises equipment

Composable disaggregated infrastructure (CDI), sometimes stylized as composable/disaggregated infrastructure, is a technology that allows enterprise data center operators to achieve the cost and availability benefits of cloud computing using on-premises networking equipment. It is considered a class of converged infrastructure, and uses management software to combine compute, storage and network elements. It is similar to public cloud, except the equipment sits on premises in an enterprise data center.

== Overview ==
American market intelligence firm International Data Corporation (IDC) describes CDI as "an emerging category of infrastructure systems that make use of high-bandwidth, low-latency interconnects to aggregate compute, storage, and networking fabric resources into shared resource pools that can be available for on-demand allocation."

These systems use what is sometimes called rack-scale architecture, which allows network operators to replace components on a rack while the entire data center behaves as a virtualized server. This allows operators to allocate compute, memory, and storage resources inside each server node on-demand, over a high speed, low latency computing fabric. The individual components can be managed as a resource pool, allowing dynamic provisioning and deprovisioning with a common application programming interface (API). No hardware configuration is required.

== Technology ==
Composability refers to the composer, which is another term for the software that allows the server resources, which include compute, storage, and RAM, to be placed into a pool to become available for applications and workloads. Disaggregation is the process of aggregating server resources with the resources of other servers in the data center. These aggregated or pooled resources can be shared by applications or workloads. The composer software controls how much of each disaggregated resource is needed from each server.

The use of software APIs to provisioning the resources without having to directly program any individual hardware device is known as programmatic control. Operators can use open APIs in composable infrastructure in order to integrate third-party software and hardware with proprietary solutions.
