= IT Manager: Duels =

2012 video game

- Developer(s): Intel
- Publisher(s): Intel
- Series: IT Manager
- Release: July 2012
- Genre(s): Strategy
- Mode(s): Single-player, multiplayer

IT Manager: Duels was a browser-based multiplayer IT management game created by Intel. It is not available anymore. In the game, players go head-to-head, applying tech solutions to build and manage virtual IT departments for competing parent companies. Each player nurtures a unique IT infrastructure that will enable its parent company to thrive. The more a company achieves, the more points its player earns.

== Gameplay ==
Players begin each game with a company whose assets include IT staff, hardware, projects and ‘events’. A small number of these assets are delivered to players at the outset of each game turn. They are tasked with building an increasingly complex and robust network infrastructure as gameplay proceeds. Points are gained by using staff to deploy hardware and then by running projects. More advanced projects generate more points but have greater hardware requirements, while more advanced hardware carries a greater staff cost to deploy.

Strategic planning and tactical timing are required to ensure that a virtual company's systems and practices can meet its business needs and cope with the events that opponents throw at each other, from denial-of-service attacks to crises such as flooding data-centres that threaten business continuity. The winner is the player who earns the most points over a predetermined number of turns or before both players have used all 100 of their items.

Players find opponents via the game's home website, where they can also acquire new and more powerful technologies to deploy in-game, as they play games and accrue ‘career points’.

== Previous release ==
The last such game created by Intel was IT Manager III: Unseen Forces, which won the 2009 British Interactive Media Association award in the best business-to-business category and the Intel Innovation Grand Prix award 2011, which Intel awards to a top supplier. IT Manager III: Unseen Forces has now been replaced with IT Manager: Duels.
