= Dewberry Island =

Island in Calhoun County, Texas, United States

Coordinates: 28°23′21″N 96°30′19″W

Dewberry Island is an island located in Espiritu Santo Bay in Calhoun County, Texas, in the United States. It is northeast of the Matagorda Island Wildlife Refuge, and on the northern side of Shoalwater Bay, in the U.S. state of Texas. It is several miles long and is an extension of the nearby Blackberry Island. Dewberry Island is located near a geographical feature known as the Army Cut.

Dewberry Island has both sandy and muddy areas. The island often experiences significant south winds. The island's elevation is 3 feet (0.91 m) above sea level. It is possible to kayak in the vicinity of it.

== See also ==
- List of islands of Texas
