= Liquid Computing =

Software company in Canada

Liquid Computing Corporation
- Type: Private company
- Industry: Unified computing
- Founded: Ottawa, Ontario (2003)
- Headquarters: Ottawa, Ontario, Canada
- Products: See
- Website: www.liquidcomputing.com

Liquid Computing was an information technology business that sold components like servers, storage, and networking systems. It was founded in 2003, and ceased operations in 2010.

The company had customers in North America and established partnerships with companies such as Intel, Microsoft, VMware, Oracle, Red Hat, NetApp and AMD.

== Corporate information ==
=== Office locations ===
The Liquid Computing Corporation was headquartered in Ottawa, Ontario, Canada, with U.S. offices.

=== Investors ===
The following Investors have funded Liquid Computing:

- VenGrowth
- ATA Ventures
- BDC (Business Development Bank of Canada)
- EDC (Export Development Canada)
- Axis Capital
- Newbury Ventures

=== History ===
- 2003 – Liquid Computing is founded by Brian Hurley (who later went on to founding Purple Forge) and Mike Kemp, two Canadian engineers from telecom equipment maker Nortel with experience building supercomputers for the U.S. government's Defense Advanced Research Project Agency (DARPA).
- 2006 – LiquidIQ 1.0 is introduced for High-Performance Computing using its own interconnect scheme coupled with AMD's HyperTransport architecture and running a modified version of Red Hat Linux.
- 2008 – LiquidIQ 2.0 is released; a unified computing system that combines standard physical data center resources, such as servers, switching, operating systems, network interfaces, and storage, with management and control software.
- 2009 – The company announces LiquidIQ 3.0 unified computing system powered by Intel Xeon 5500 (Nehalem) Series Processors.
- Q4 2009 – The company introduces Liquid Elements, a unified computing solution that extends the power of unified computing across datacenter hardware from leading vendors. The current solution configuration combines with Intel Server System SR1680MV and NetApp storage.
- February 2010 – The company shuts down.

== Links ==
- If the Data Center Is the Computer the Fight Is on to Control the Ecosystem – GigaOM
- A True Datacenter In A Box – Network Computing
- "Liquid to float slushy Intel servers". The Register. November 6, 2009.
- Fast-growing Liquid Computing at a 'watershed moment' – Ottawa Citizen
- "Can Liquid Computing ride Cisco's California coattails?". The Register. August 5, 2009.
- The Liquid Approach To Unified Computing – ITBusinessEdge
- Liquid Computing – fast out of the starting gate – Network World
- 451 Group Impact Report
