= Fabric computing =

Consolidated high-performance computing platform

Fabric computing or unified computing involves constructing a computing fabric consisting of interconnected nodes that look like a weave or a fabric when seen collectively from a distance.

Usually the phrase refers to a consolidated high-performance computing system consisting of loosely coupled storage, networking and parallel processing functions linked by high bandwidth interconnects (such as 10 Gigabit Ethernet and InfiniBand) but the term has also been used to describe platforms such as the Azure Services Platform and grid computing in general (where the common theme is interconnected nodes that appear as a single logical unit).

The fundamental components of fabrics are "nodes" (processor(s), memory, and/or peripherals) and "links" (functional connections between nodes). While the term "fabric" has also been used in association with storage area networks and with switched fabric networking, the introduction of compute resources provides a complete "unified" computing system. Other terms used to describe such fabrics include "unified fabric", "data center fabric" and "unified data center fabric".

Ian Foster, director of the Computation Institute at the Argonne National Laboratory and University of Chicago suggested in 2007 that grid computing "fabrics" were "poised to become the underpinning for next-generation enterprise IT architectures and be used by a much greater part of many organizations".

== History ==
While the term has been in use since the mid to late 1990s the growth of cloud computing and Cisco's evangelism of unified data center fabrics followed by unified computing (an evolutionary data center architecture whereby blade servers are integrated or unified with supporting network and storage infrastructure) starting March 2009 has renewed interest in the technology.

There have been mixed reactions to Cisco's architecture, particularly from rivals who claim that these proprietary systems will lock out other vendors. Analysts claim that this "ambitious new direction" is "a big risk" as companies such as IBM and HP who have previously partnered with Cisco on data center projects (accounting for $2–3bn of Cisco's annual revenue) are now competing with them.

In 2007, Wombat Financial Software launched the "Wombat Data Fabric," the first commercial off-the-shelf software platform providing high performance / low-latency RDMA-based messaging across an Infiniband switch.

== Key characteristics ==
The main advantages of fabrics are that massive concurrent processing combined with a huge, tightly coupled address space makes it possible to solve huge computing problems (such as those presented by delivery of cloud computing services); and that they are both scalable and able to be dynamically reconfigured.

Challenges include a non-linearly degrading performance curve, whereby adding resources does not linearly increase performance which is a common problem with parallel computing and maintaining security.

== Companies ==
As of 2015 companies offering unified or fabric computing systems include Avaya, Brocade, Cisco, Dell, Egenera, HPE, IBM, Liquid Computing Corporation, TIBCO, Unisys, and Xsigo Systems.

== See also ==
- Cloud computing
- Converged infrastructure
- Grid computing
- Omni-Path
- Parallel computing
  - Massively parallel
  - Massively parallel processor array (MPPA)
