= Data Center Manageability Interface =

Data Center Manageability Interface (DCMI) is a data center system management standard based on the Intelligent Platform Management Interface (IPMI) but designed to be more suitable for data center management: it uses the interfaces defined in IPMI, but minimizes the number of optional interfaces and includes power capping control, among other differences.

The DCMI specification was developed at Intel, and first published in 2008.

== See also ==
- Redfish (specification)
