= Little Goat Island =

Island off the coast of Jamaica

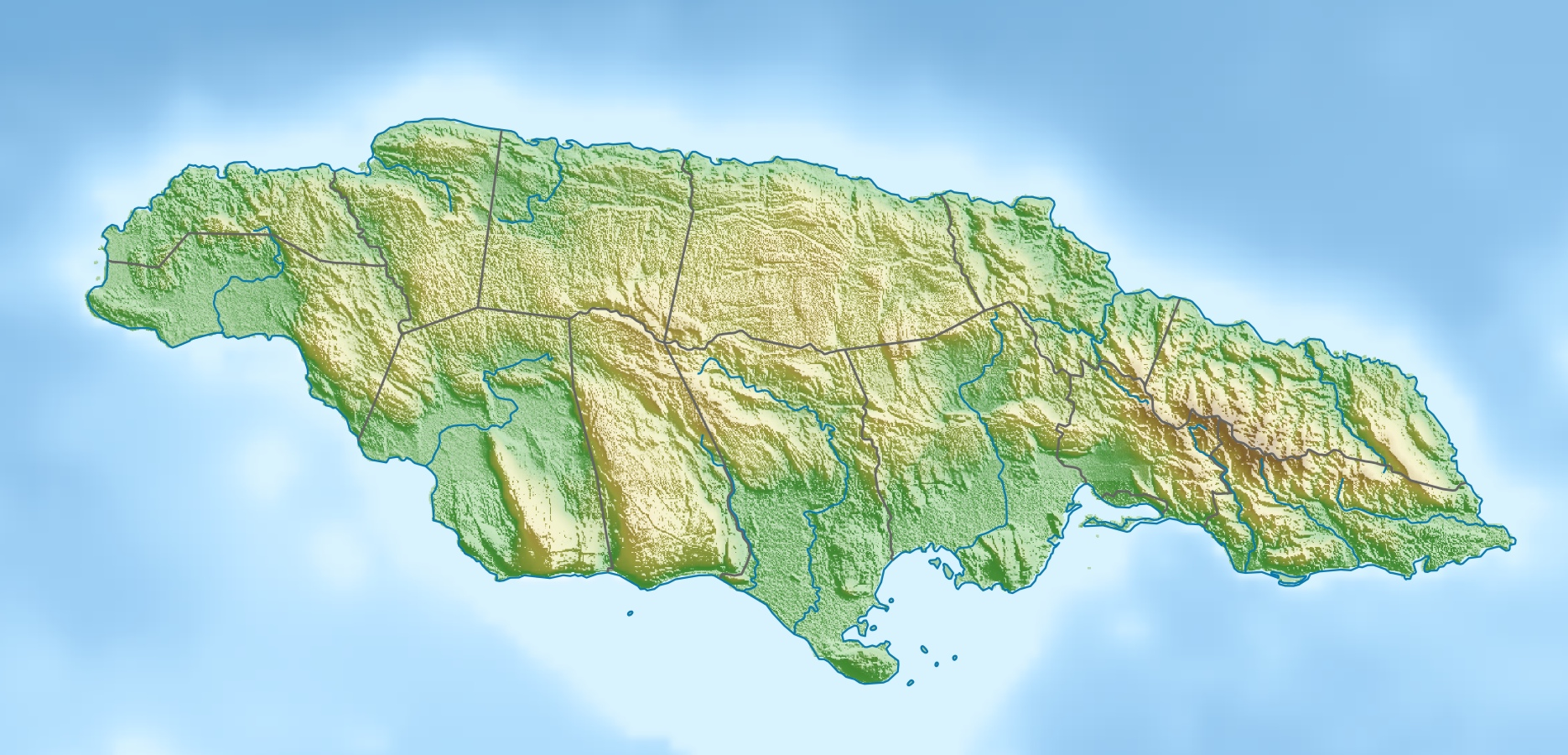
- Location within Jamaica Location within the Caribbean

Geography
- Location: Caribbean Sea
- Coordinates: 17.886°N 77.070°W
- Length: 2.0 km (1.24 mi)
- Width: 0.9 km (0.56 mi)
- Highest elevation: 18 m (59 ft)

Administration
- Jamaica
- Parish: Saint Catherine Parish

Little Goat Island along with Great Goat Island are the cays that make up the Goat Islands, located less than a mile off the coast of Jamaica, southwest of the Hellshire Hills. It is part of Saint Catherine Parish. Little Goat Island is adjacent to the northwest portion of Great Goat Island, and both are within the Portland Bight Protected Area.

== History ==
On 2 September 1940, the United States obtained a 99-year lease on Little Goat Island under the Destroyers for Bases Agreement with the United Kingdom. This agreement was ratified on 27 March 1941 after which the United States built a seaplane base on the island.

A total of 2,800,000 cubic yards of dredging was necessary to remove shoals from the seaplane runway and to deepen the anchorages and channel approaches to the piers. Gasoline storage, totaling 75,000 gallons, was provided in eleven underground steel tanks.

Shortly after the war the base was abandoned by the United States, which nonetheless retained a lease on the island.

At independence in 1962, Jamaica replaced Britain as party to the agreement. The United States Department of State website states:

By an exchange of notes on August 7, 1962, between the High Commissioner for the United Kingdom in Jamaica and the Prime Minister and Minister of External Affairs and Defence of Jamaica, the Government of Jamaica agreed to assume, from August 6, 1962, all obligations and responsibilities of the United Kingdom which arise from any valid instrument (including any instrument made by the Government of the Federation of The West Indies by virtue of the authority entrusted by the Government of the United Kingdom). The rights and benefits heretofore enjoyed by the Government of the United Kingdom by virtue of application of any such international instrument to Jamaica are from August 6, 1962, enjoyed by the Government of Jamaica.

== Flora and fauna ==
Until the 1940s, these cays were home to a population of Jamaican Iguana. However, as with most mainland populations, the Little Goat Island population was thought to have become extinct, mainly due to predation by introduced small Indian mongooses and habitat alteration by feral goats.
