= Pine Island (Lake Livingston) =

Island in Lake Livingston, Texas, United States

Coordinates: 30.665583°N 95.05505°W

Pine Island is an island situated in the southern end of Lake Livingston, Texas, a man-made reservoir on the Trinity River. It is within the boundaries of San Jacinto County, Texas.

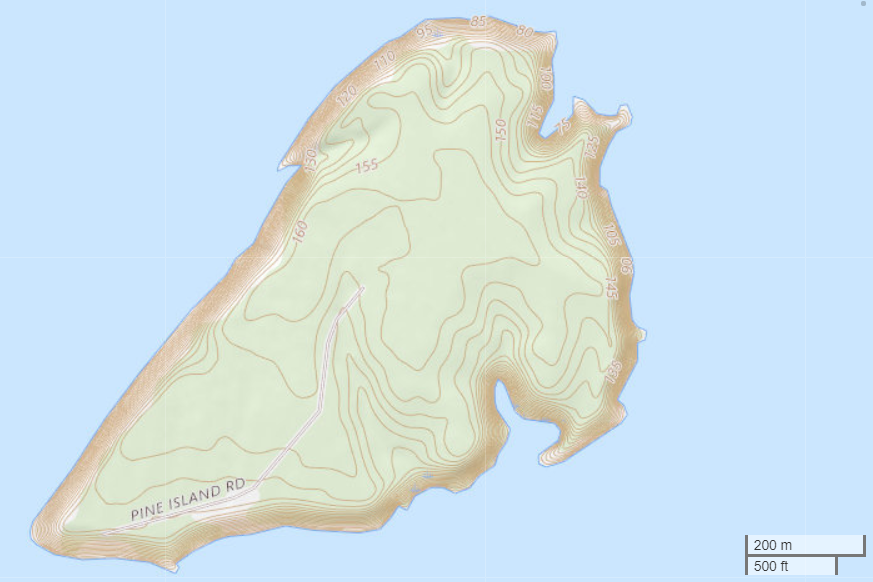
Pine Island is a natural island formed when the Trinity River was dammed to form Lake Livingston.

The island is 0.21 square miles in area. It has 10- to 30-ft-high sand bluffs on all sides, though access to the island can be obtained from a sandy beach at the southwestern tip. One named road on the island, Pine Island Road, leads from the access point to the center of the island. The maximum elevation of the island is 165 feet (50.3 metres) above mean sea level.

Pine Island is a popular destination for fishermen and recreational boaters, where boats can often been seen anchored offshore. However, no services are available on the island.

An alligator population was reported in 2018. The Texas Parks and Wildlife Department warns swimmers and boaters to practice safety and exercise caution around the alligators.
