= Goat Island (Columbia County, Oregon) =

Island in Columbia County, Oregon, United States

- Interactive map of Goat Island

Geography
- Coordinates: 45°56′14″N 122°48′57″W
- Adjacent to: Columbia River
- Highest elevation: 6 m (20 ft)

Administration
- United States
- State: Oregon
- County: Clackamas

Demographics
- Population: 0

Goat Island is an island in the Columbia River in Columbia County, Oregon. It is located adjacent to Deer Island. Goat Island was named as such by the United States Board on Geographic Names in 1976.
