= Converged storage =

Computer data storage architecture

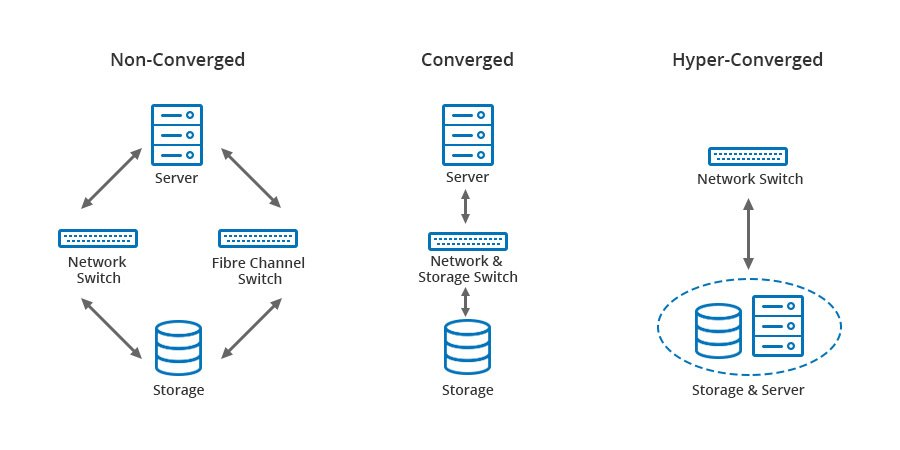
Difference between non-converged, converged and hyper-converged network storage

Converged storage is a storage architecture that combines storage and computing resources into a single entity. This can result in the development of platforms for server centric, storage centric or hybrid workloads where applications and data come together to improve application performance and delivery. The combination of storage and compute differs to the traditional IT model in which computation and storage take place in separate or siloed computer equipment. The traditional model requires discrete provisioning changes, such as upgrades and planned migrations, in the face of server load changes, which are increasingly dynamic with virtualization, where converged storage increases the supply of resources along with new VM demands in parallel.

== Design considerations ==
The goal of converged storage is to bring together server and storage and/or application and data to deliver services that are better optimized for target workloads. This can mean server and storage converged within a common hardware platform. For example, a blade server enclosure, applications and storage can be brought together within a server by virtualization. Server and storage can be managed as a resource pool, for example in infrastructure- as-a-service (IaaS).

== Common hardware platform ==
Industry standard servers, such as those using Intel processors (x86), form the basis of converged storage. As these servers follow Moore’s Law and increase power and performance they have the capabilities to run storage workloads, in addition to being compute servers. Data centers can further consolidate and minimize the use of physical space and energy by using industry-standard –based blade server for both server and storage.

== Common software ==
In server virtualization, multiple "virtual" servers operate on a single platform using hypervisor technology. These virtual servers could be running traditional server tasks, such as applications programming. By using storage controller software, these servers could also be made into data storage systems. This latter architecture is known as virtual machine-based storage. The storage software is often called a VSA−virtual SAN appliance or virtual storage appliance. VSA products from companies such as HP, Nutanix and VMware allow users to build storage-area networks using their existing servers.

== Infrastructure-as-a-Service (IaaS) ==
The goal of IaaS is to provide a pool of resources that can be quickly deployed to deliver new services. This requires a service designer to lay out the required characteristics for a new service or application and an orchestration (computing) engine to configure the underlying infrastructure to deliver the new service.

== Characteristics ==
=== Scale-out architecture ===
Scale-out architecture is a component of converged storage. Scale-out storage is the combination of modular computers and standardized storage components to create federated storage pools. The result is an increase of computer power, bandwidth and storage capacity that can exceed that of a single traditional storage array or high performance computer. Storage vendors such as NetApp, Dell, Hewlett-Packard and EMC provide scale-out storage to address both the growth of unstructured data and the need to simplify data center operations. At the file system level, parallel file systems like BeeGFS are available to provide a single namespace with automatic data distribution for shared network access across the internal storage devices of multiple servers.

Scale-out storage differs from scale-up architectures in traditional storage, which primarily scales by adding many individual disk drives to a single non-clustered storage controller. In a scale-out architecture, management software is used to manage the multiple storage devices, to act like a single system. Storage analyst company, Enterprise Strategy Group, writes that scale-out storage can help to provide timely IT provisioning, improve system availability and provide better resource utilization.

=== Federation ===
Storage federation (also known as federated storage) uses distributed volume management to shift workloads from busy arrays to those with available capacity. This is done using native peer-to-peer communication. Multiple autonomous storage systems are combined and managed as a single storage pool. This helps to improve storage utilization, balance workloads and ease storage migration.

=== Multitenant architecture ===
Converged storage supports the multitenant (multitenancy) architecture of cloud computing, in which multiple machines or users access the virtual and physical resources at the same time. In addition to storage, the other resources accessed in this architecture are processors and networks. A converged storage does this by moving application workloads between disk systems.

== Comparisons to traditional storage architectures ==
=== Monolithic storage architectures ===
Monolithic storage architectures share RAM across multiple IO controllers. They have been characterized as large storage arrays that require a large upfront investment and resources. Hitachi Vantara, is quoted as saying such storage requires enterprises to spend $500,000 on customizing their data centers to support the power requirements of monolithic equipment. Monolithic arrays provide failover benefits. The shared cache architecture of monolithic arrays ensures that if one cache module fails, another cache is used to process the user's request. However once you have more than a single system this architecture is complex and requires investment to manage and control the interactions between the different components. Monolithic architectures support both block and file-based architectures, either independently or in a unified storage system that brings together both block and file.

=== Direct-attached storage ===
Direct-attached storage (DAS) provides scaling of storage directly attached to the server. The storage is dedicated to a single server and is not sharable among multiple servers. Data stored on a Storage area network (SAN) and network-attached storage (NAS) architectures can be shared among several server applications.
