= Dagger Island =

Island in Texas, United States

Coordinates: 27°50′06″N 97°10′16″W

Dagger Island is an island in Nueces County, Texas, and part of Aransas Pass, Texas, but closer to central Ingleside, Texas. Corpus Christi Bay is located to the south. Redfish Cove is to the north.
