= Goat Island (Clackamas County, Oregon) =

Island in Oregon

- Interactive map of Goat Island

Geography
- Coordinates: 45°22′20″N 122°36′44″W
- Adjacent to: Willamette River
- Highest elevation: 7 m (23 ft)

Administration
- United States
- State: Oregon
- County: Clackamas

Demographics
- Population: 0

Goat Island is an island in the Willamette River in Clackamas County, Oregon. It is located within the city limits of West Linn, Oregon. Goat Island is a habitat for herons and contains 30 heron nests.
