= Goat Island (Michigan) =

Island in Michigan

- Location within Michigan Location within the United States

Geography
- Location: Michigan
- Coordinates: 42°12′51″N 84°18′57″W
- Adjacent to: Center Lake
- Highest elevation: 581 ft (177.1 m)

Administration
- United States
- State: Michigan
- County: Jackson

Goat Island is an island in Center Lake, in Jackson County, Michigan, at 42°12′51″N 84°18′57″W; the United States Geological Survey gives its elevation as 287 feet (87 m).
