= Goat Island (Ardmore) =

Beach in Ireland

Coordinates: 51.94558°N 7.76112°W

Goat Island beach

Goat Island is a beach located roughly 5 kilometres (3.1 mi) west of Ardmore, County Waterford, Ireland, in the townland of Ardoginna. The beach is secluded and difficult to find. The inlet where it is located faces south and is sheltered by a sea stack.
