= Converged infrastructure =

Way of structuring an IT system

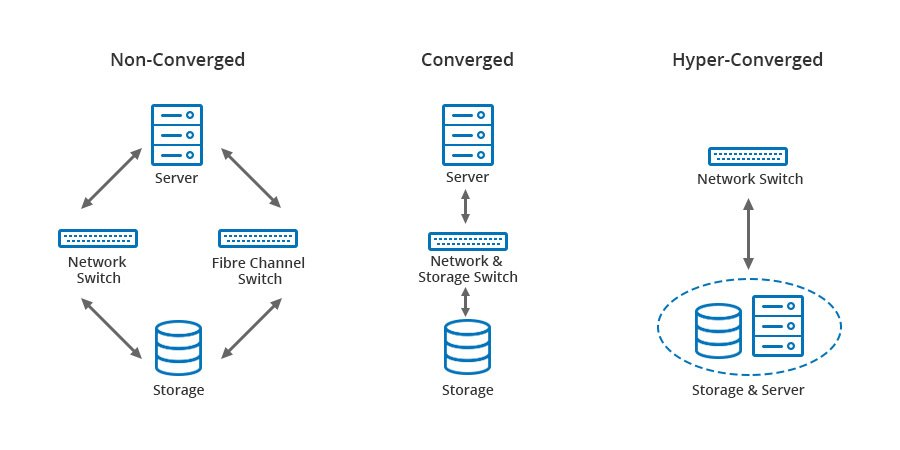
Difference between non-converged, converged and hyper-converged network storage

Converged infrastructure is a way of structuring an information technology (IT) system which groups multiple components into a single optimized computing package. Components of a converged infrastructure may include servers, data storage devices, networking equipment and software for IT infrastructure management, automation and orchestration.

IT organizations use converged infrastructure to centralize the management of IT resources, to consolidate systems, to increase resource-utilization rates, and to lower costs. Converged infrastructures foster these objectives by implementing pools of computers, storage and networking resources that can be shared by multiple applications and managed in a collective manner using policy-driven processes.

IT vendors and IT industry analysts use various terms to describe the concept of a converged infrastructure. These include "converged system", "unified computing", "fabric-based computing", and "dynamic infrastructure".

== The evolution of data centers ==
Historically, to keep pace with the growth of business applications and the data they generate, IT resources were deployed in a silo-like fashion. One set of resources has been devoted to one particular computing technology, business application or line of business. These resources support a single set of assumptions and cannot be optimized or reconfigured to support varying usage loads.

The proliferation of IT sprawl in data centers has contributed to rising operations costs, reducing productivity, and stifling agility and flexibility. Maintenance and operations can consume two-thirds of an organization's technology budget, according to a 2009 InformationWeek survey of executives in 500 companies with annual revenue over $250 million. That leaves just a third of the budget for new IT initiatives. This ratio prevents IT from supporting new business initiatives or responding to real application demands.

A converged infrastructure addresses the problem of siloed architectures and IT sprawl by pooling and sharing IT resources. Rather than dedicating a set of resources to a particular computing technology, application or line of business, converged infrastructure creates a pool of virtualized servers, storage and networking capacity that is shared by multiple applications and lines of business.

== Benefits ==
Converged infrastructure provides both technical and business efficiencies, according to industry researchers and observers. These gains stem in part from the pre-integration of technology components, the pooling of IT resources and the automation of IT processes. Converged infrastructure further contributes to efficient data centers by enhancing the ability of cloud computing systems to handle enormous data sets, using only a single integrated IT management system

Writing in CIO magazine, Forrester Research analyst Robert Whiteley noted that converged infrastructures, combining server, storage, and networks into a single framework, help to transform the economics [of] running the datacenter thus accelerating the transition to IP storage to help build infrastructures that are "cloud-ready". The combination of storage and compute into a single entity is known as converged storage.

Decreased complexity, through the use of pre-integrated hardware with virtualization and automation management tools, is another important value proposition for converged infrastructure as noted in an IDC study.

In April 2012, the open source analyst firm Wikibon released the first market forecast for converged infrastructure, with a projected $402 billion total available market (TAM) by 2017 of which, nearly 2/3 of the infrastructure that supports enterprise applications will be packaged in some type of converged solution by 2017.

InformationWeek highlighted the promise of two long-term advantages of a unified data center infrastructure:

1. Lower costs as the result of both:

- lower capital expenses resulting from higher utilization, less cabling, and fewer network connections;
- lower operating costs resulting from reduced labor via automated data center management and a consolidating storage and network management infrastructure teams.

2. Increased IT agility by:

- virtualizing IP and Fibre Channel storage networking;
- allowing for single console management.

Data centers around the world are reaching limits in power, cooling and space. At the same time, capital constraints are requiring organizations to rethink data center strategy. Converged infrastructure offers a solution to these challenges.

== Converged infrastructure and cloud computing ==
Converged infrastructure can serve as an enabling platform for private and public cloud computing services, including infrastructure as a service (IaaS), platform as a service (PaaS), and software as a service (SaaS) offerings.

Several characteristics make converged infrastructure well suited to cloud deployments. These include the ability to pool IT resources, to automate resource provisioning and to scale up and down capacity quickly to meet the needs of dynamic computing workloads.

== See also ==
- Composable disaggregated infrastructure
- Hyper-converged infrastructure
- Intelligent workload management
- Software-defined data center
- Converged storage
