= Goat Island (Stephens County, Texas) =

Coordinates: 32°38′36″N 98°51′56″W

Goat Island is an island located on Lake Daniel in Stephens County, Texas.
