= Hellshire Hills =

Area of dry forest in Jamaica

Coordinates: 17°54′N 76°57′W

- Hills
- Location: Saint Catherine Parish, Jamaica
- Part of: Portland Bight Protected Area
- Geology: Dry limestone hills
- Designation: Important Bird Area (IBA)

Hellshire Hills is a region of dry limestone hills in Saint Catherine Parish, Jamaica, which forms part of the Portland Bight Protected Area.

== Environment ==
The region supports one of the largest remaining areas of dry limestone forest in the Caribbean. A 1970 survey of the forest noted 271 species of plants in the forest of which 53 are only found in Jamaica.

The forest is home to threatened Jamaican endemic animals, including the Jamaican iguana and the blue-tailed galliwasp. The area has also been designated an Important Bird Area (IBA) by BirdLife International because it supports significant populations of many Jamaican bird species.

== See also ==
- Jamaican dry forests
