= Redfish (specification) =

Standard management API

- Abbreviation: Redfish
- Status: Published
- Year started: 2014; 12 years ago
- Organization: Distributed Management Task Force
- Related standards: Systems Management Architecture for Server Hardware
- Domain: Server management
- Website: www.dmtf.org/standards/redfish

The Redfish standard is a suite of specifications that deliver an industry standard protocol providing a RESTful interface for the management of servers, storage, networking, and converged infrastructure.

== History ==
The Redfish standard has been elaborated under the SPMF umbrella at the DMTF in 2014. The first specification with base models (1.0) was published in August 2015. In 2016, models for BIOS, disk drives, memory, storage, volume, endpoint, fabric, switch, PCIe device, zone, software/firmware inventory & update, multi-function NICs, host interface (KCS replacement) and privilege mapping were added. In 2017, Models for Composability, Location and errata were added. There is work in progress for Ethernet Switching, DCIM, and OCP.

In August 2016, SNIA released a first model for network storage services (Swordfish), an extension of the Redfish specification.

== Industry adoption ==
=== Redfish support on server ===
- Advantech SKY Server BMC
- Dell iDRAC BMC with minimum iDRAC 7/8 FW 2.40.40.40, iDRAC9 FW 3.00.00.0
- Fujitsu iRMCS5 BMC
- HPE iLO BMC with minimum iLO4 FW 2.30, iLO5 and more recent
- HPE Moonshot BMC with minimum FW 1.41
- Lenovo XClarity Controller (XCC) BMC with minimum XCC FW 1.00
- Supermicro X10 BMC with minimum FW 3.0 and X11 with minimum FW 1.0
- IBM Power Systems BMC with minimum OpenPOWER (OP) firmware level OP940
- IBM Power Systems Flexible Service Processor (FSP) with minimum firmware level FW860.20
- Cisco Integrated Management Controller with minimum IMC SW Version 3.0
- Pi-KVM with minimum KVMd version 2.0, also offers an alternative HTTP API

=== Redfish support on BMC ===
- Insyde Software Supervyse BMC
- OpenBMC a Linux Foundation collaborative open-source BMC firmware stack
- American Megatrends MegaRAC Remote Management Firmware
- Vertiv Avocent Core Insight Embedded Management Systems

=== Software using Redfish APIs ===
- OpenStack Ironic bare metal deployment project has a Redfish driver.
- Ansible has multiple Redfish modules for Remote Management including redfish_info, redfish_config, and redfish_command
- ManageIQ
- Apache CloudStack

=== Redfish libraries and tools ===
- DMTF libraries and tools
- GoLang gofish
- Mojo::Redfish::Client
- python-redfish
- Sushy

Redfish is used by both proprietary software (such as HPE OneView) as well as open source software (such as OpenBMC).

== See also ==
- Intelligent Platform Management Interface (IPMI)
- Create, read, update and delete (CRUD)
- JSON
- OData – Protocol for REST APIs
