= Goat Island (Lake Wylie) =

Island in York County, South Carolina, United States

Coordinates: 35.028263°N 81.045357°W

Goat Island is a small uninhabited Island located .2 miles from India Hook, South Carolina in Lake Wylie of York County, South Carolina, United States.

== Sources ==
- "Saving Goat Island". The Herald. June 29, 2007.
