= Xsigo Systems =

Computer I/O company acquired by Oracle

- Type: Private
- Industry: Information Technology, networking
- Founded: 2004
- Defunct: September 2012
- Fate: Acquired by Oracle
- Headquarters: San Jose, California
- Key people: Mark Leslie, Chairman, Ashok Krishnamurthi, Vice-Chairman and Founder, Lloyd Carney, CEO
- Website: www.xsigo.com

Xsigo Systems was an information technology and hardware company based in San Jose, California, US, specializing in data center network and I/O virtualization software and hardware for companies and enterprises.

== Company History ==
Xsigo Systems was founded in August 2004 by three brothers: Ashok Krishnamurthi, R.K. Anand, and S.K. Vinod along with Shreyas Shah. Xsigo Systems operated as a privately held company in San Jose, CA and funded by Kleiner Perkins, Khosla Ventures, North Bridge Venture Partners, and Greylock Partners. Ashok Krishnamurthi served as vice-chairman of the company, and previously held the positions of Vice President and General Manager of the infrastructure product line at Juniper Networks. Lloyd Carney served as the chief executive officer of the company. Carney was General Manager of IBM's Netcool Division and prior to that, was chairman and CEO of Micromuse. Prior to Micromuse, Carney was COO at Juniper Networks and head of three divisions at Nortel Networks.

The company filed a patent for a system for communication between computer systems via an I/O bus, which was granted on May 3, 2011

Xsigo Systems was purchased by Oracle Corporation. The deal was announced at the end of July, 2012 and finalized on September 12, 2012.

== Products and services ==
Xsigo Systems' product, the I/O Director, is a hardware and software device that consolidates data center infrastructure and streamlines server I/O management. Using the Xsigo I/O Director, users provision I/O resources on live servers, without disrupting network and storage configurations, and without physically entering the data center. Xsigo's I/O virtualization solution replaces a server's multiple Ethernet and Fibre Channel interfaces with a single high-speed Ethernet or InfiniBand link. Multiple virtual Ethernet interfaces (vNICs) and virtual Fibre Channel interfaces (vHBAs) communicate over this link. Virtual interfaces are established using Xsigo's virtualization hardware and Xsigo's host drivers. These virtual I/O resources appear to the server's applications like their traditional I/O card-based counterparts but unlike traditional I/O resources, vNICs and vHBAs can be created as needed and do not require the server to be opened or rebooted.

== Awards and achievements ==
Xsigo awards and achievements include The Wall Street Journal Technology Innovation Award in the Network / Internet Technologies category and being named Storage Magazine's Product of the Year in the networking equipment category. Xsigo Systems' VP780 I/O Director was also nominated for SYS-CON's Virtualization Journal Readers' Choice and Awards for Best Network Virtualization.
