= OpenBMC =

Open source implementation of the Baseboard Management Controllers (BMC) Firmware Stack

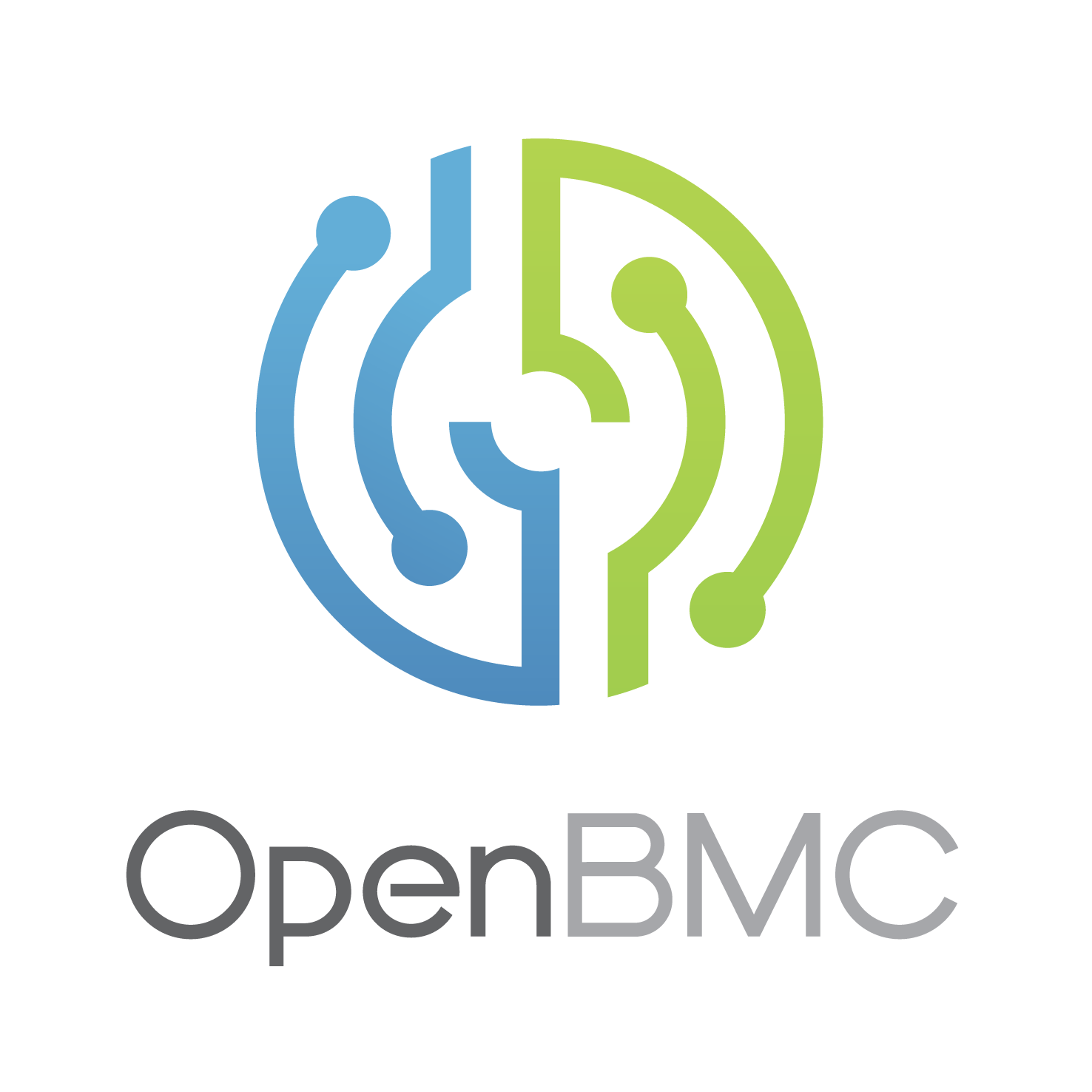
- Developer: OpenBMC community
- Release: 3 November 2015; 10 years ago
- Stable release: 2.18.0 / 30 May 2025; 15 months ago
- Written in: C, C++
- Available in: Mainly English
- License: Apache License 2.0
- Website: www.openbmc.org
- Repository: github.com/openbmc/openbmc

The OpenBMC project is a Linux Foundation collaborative open-source project that produces an open source implementation of the baseboard management controllers (BMC) firmware stack. OpenBMC is a Linux distribution for BMCs meant to work across heterogeneous systems that include enterprise, high-performance computing (HPC), telecommunications, and cloud-scale data centers.

== History ==
In 2014, four Facebook programmers at a Facebook hackathon event created a prototype open-source BMC firmware stack named OpenBMC. In 2015, IBM collaborated with Rackspace on an open-source BMC firmware stack also named OpenBMC. These projects were similar in name and concept only. In March 2018, OpenBMC became a Linux Foundation project and converged on the IBM stack. Founding organizations of the OpenBMC project are Microsoft, Intel, IBM, Google, and Facebook. A technical steering committee was formed to guide the project with representation from the five founding companies. Brad Bishop from IBM was elected chair of the technical steering committee. In April 2019, Arm Holdings joined as the 6th member of the OpenBMC technical steering committee.

== Features ==
OpenBMC uses the Yocto Project as the underlying building and distribution generation framework. The firmware itself is based on U-Boot. OpenBMC uses D-Bus as an inter-process communication (IPC). OpenBMC includes a web application for interacting with the firmware stack. OpenBMC added Redfish support for hardware management.

== Systems ==
Google/Rackspace partnership
Barreleye G2 / Zaius—two-socket server platform using POWER9 processors.
IBM
Power Systems AC922 also "Witherspoon" or "Newell"—two-socket, 2U Accelerated Computing (AC) node using POWER9 processors with up to 6 Nvidia Volta GPUs. AC922 was used in the U.S. Department of Energy's Sierra and Summit supercomputers.
Power System's S1024, L1024, S1022, L1022, S1022, S1014, and E1050 – 1–4 socket Power10 systems
Raptor Computing Systems / Raptor Engineering
Talos II—two-socket workstation and development platform; available as 4U server, tower, or EATX mainboard.
Talos II Lite – single-socket version of the Talos II mainboard, made using the same PCB.
Blackbird – single-socket microATX platform using SMT4 Sforza POWER9 processors, 4–8 cores, 2 RAM slots (supporting up to 256 GiB total)
