= Pelican Island (Corpus Christi Bay) =

Island in the Corpus Christi Bay, Texas, United States

Coordinates: 27.820°N 97.156°W

Pelican Island is a semi-tropical island in the Corpus Christi Bay, situated immediately south of the Corpus Christi Ship Channel. It is one of the largest habitats of both brown pelicans and white pelicans in the Texas. In the late 1980s, Pelican Island was the only location in all of Texas where nesting brown pelicans could be found.
