= Red Fish Island =

Coordinates: 29.5178°N 94.8910°W

Red Fish Island is an island in Chambers County, Texas, near the community of Bacliff. Its elevation is 7 feet (2.1 m) above sea level. It is located in Galveston Bay, northeast of San Leon. Its land is mostly rocky, but it also contains a beach where tourists visit the island.

In the 1990s, the island disappeared, as it sunk below sea-level. In 2003, the Port Authority, the U. S. Army Corps of Engineers and the Beneficial Uses Group created a plan to raise the island from beneth the waves. The project was completed in ten months and an event was held at the Port of Houston Authority Cruise Terminal welcoming the return of the island.

== See also ==
- List of islands of Texas
