= Intelligent workload management =

Intelligent workload management (IWM) is a paradigm for IT systems management arising from the intersection of dynamic infrastructure, virtualization, identity management, and the discipline of software appliance development. IWM enables the management and optimization of computing resources in a secure and compliant manner across physical, virtual and cloud environments to deliver business services for end customers.

The IWM paradigm builds on the traditional concept of workload management whereby processing resources are dynamically assigned to tasks, or "workloads," based on criteria such as business process priorities (for example, in balancing business intelligence queries against online transaction processing), resource availability, security protocols, or event scheduling, but extends the concept into the structure of individual workloads themselves.

== Definition of "workload" ==
In the context of IT systems and data center management, a "workload" can be broadly defined as "the total requests made by users and applications of a system." However, it is also possible to break down the entire workload of a given system into sets of self-contained units. Such a self-contained unit constitutes a "workload" in the narrow sense: an integrated stack consisting of application, middleware, database, and operating system devoted to a specific computing task. Typically, a workload is "platform agnostic," meaning that it can run in physical, virtual or cloud computing environments. Finally, a collection of related workloads which allow end users to complete a specific set of business tasks can be defined as a "business service."

== Making workloads "intelligent" ==
A workload is considered "intelligent" when it a) understands its security protocols and processing requirements so it can self-determine whether it can deploy in the public cloud, the private cloud or only on physical machines; b) recognizes when it is at capacity and can find alternative computing capacity as required to optimize performance; c) carries identity and access controls as well as log management and compliance reporting capabilities with it as it moves across environments; and d) is fully integrated with the business service management layer, ensuring that end user computing requirements are not disrupted by distributed computing resources, and working with current and emergent IT management frameworks.

== Intelligent workloads and security in the cloud ==
The deployment of individual workloads and workload-based business services in the "hybrid distributed data center," - including physical machines, data centers, private clouds, and the public cloud - raises a host of issues for the efficient management of provisioning, security, and compliance. By making workloads "intelligent" so that they can effectively manage themselves in terms of where they run, how they run, and who can access them, intelligent workload management addresses these issues in a way that is efficient, flexible, and scalable. The 1989 seminal work by D.F. Ferguson, Y. Yemini, and C. Nikolaou "Microeconomic Algorithms for Load Balancing in Distributed Computing Systems" developed a theory by which workloads could be made "intelligent" to manage themselves. This theory has since been patented and was commercialized by the Boston-based company, VMTurbo, in 2009.

== See also ==
- Cloud computing
- Dynamic infrastructure
- Identity management
- Portable application
- Software appliance
- Virtual appliance
