= Celestus duquesneyi =

Conservation status
- Critically Endangered (IUCN 3.1)

Scientific classification
- Kingdom: Animalia
- Phylum: Chordata
- Class: Reptilia
- Order: Squamata
- Suborder: Anguimorpha
- Family: Diploglossidae
- Genus: Celestus
- Species: C. duquesneyi

Binomial name
- Celestus duquesneyi Grant, 1940

Species of lizard

Celestus duquesneyi, commonly known as Duquesney's galliwasp or the blue-tailed galliwasp, is a species of lizard in the family Diploglossidae. The species is endemic to Jamaica.

== Etymology ==
The specific name, duquesneyi, is in honor of Douglas DuQuesnay.

== Geographic range ==
C. duquesneyi is found in southern Jamaica.

== Habitat ==
The preferred natural habitat of C. duquesneyi is forest, at altitudes of 86–166 m (282–545 ft).

== Description ==
Moderate-sized for its genus, C. duquesneyi may attain a snout-to-vent length of almost 10 cm (3.9 in).

== Behavior ==
C. duquesneyi is terrestrial.

== Reproduction ==
C. duquesneyi is ovoviviparous.
