= Goat Island (Tarrant County, Texas) =

Island in Tarrant County, Texas, United States

Coordinates: 32°48′12″N 97°28′35″W

Goat Island is an island located in Lake Worth, in Tarrant County, Texas.
