= Goat Island (Galveston County, Texas) =

Island in Galveston County, Texas, United States

Coordinates: 29°28′11″N 94°39′56″W

Goat Island is an island in Galveston County, Texas. It is just north of the Bolivar Peninsula.

In 2008, Goat Island was the site of a massive oil spill by St. Mary Land and Exploration Company, following landfall by Hurricane Ike.
