= Portland Bight Protected Area =

Protected area in Jamaica

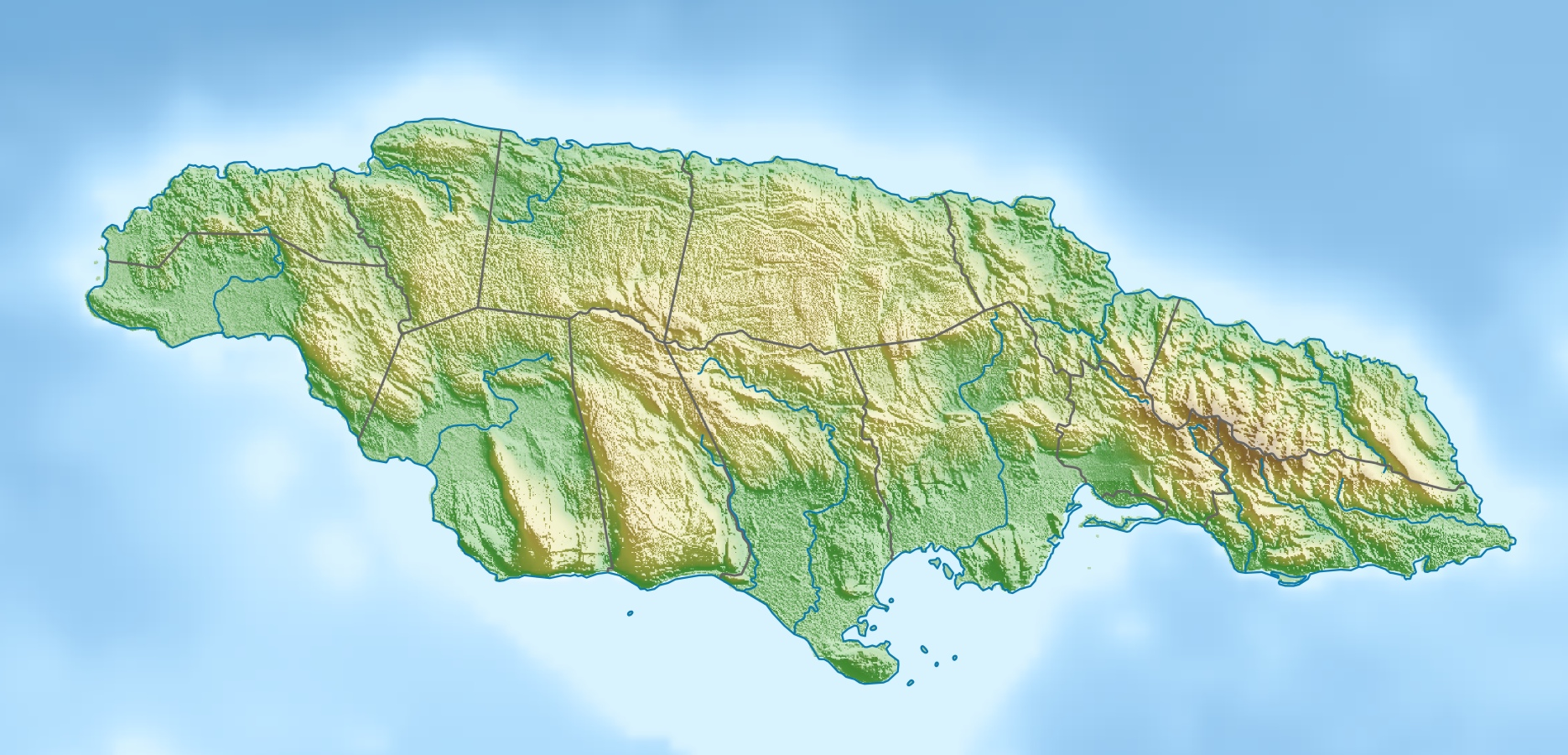
- Location within Jamaica
- Location: Jamaica
- Coordinates: 17°41′38″N 77°06′43″W
- Area: 724 mi^{2} (1,880 km^{2})
- Established: 1999

The Portland Bight Protected Area (PBPA) is a large marine and terrestrial area on the island of Jamaica located southwest of Kingston. Nearby cays such as Little Goat Island are included. It is the largest protected area in Jamaica and comprises 1,880 square kilometres (730 sq mi). Part of the task in forming the PBPA going forward is to find a balance between protecting the ecosystem from destruction by economic development and allowing the human inhabitants a means to live and work. The Caribbean Coastal Area Management Foundation (C-CAM) is charged with managing zones within the protected area.

== Description ==
The PBPA includes 83 square kilometres (32 sq mi) of wetlands, mangrove coastlines and seagrass beds that serve as a nursery for fish and shellfish breeding. On land there are 210 square kilometres (81 sq mi) of dry limestone forests, 60 known caves, and it includes a human population of 50,000.

Although the first priority in forming the protected area was to protect the coral reefs, it also serves to protect vulnerable and endemic species. The site has been designated an Important Bird Area (IBA) by BirdLife International because it supports significant populations of Jamaican birds.

== History ==
The PBPA was established in 1999. In 2013 the PNP Government of Jamaica proposed to develop the Goat Islands, in the PBPA, as a transhipment hub in conjunction with the Chinese government. Environmentalists argued that it would have a severe impact on the entire protected area. In 2016 the Prime Minister, Andrew Holness of the JLP, stated that the Goat Islands were no longer being considered as a base for a transhipment hub.

== See also ==
- Hellshire Hills
