= Dataindustrier AB =

Swedish computer firm

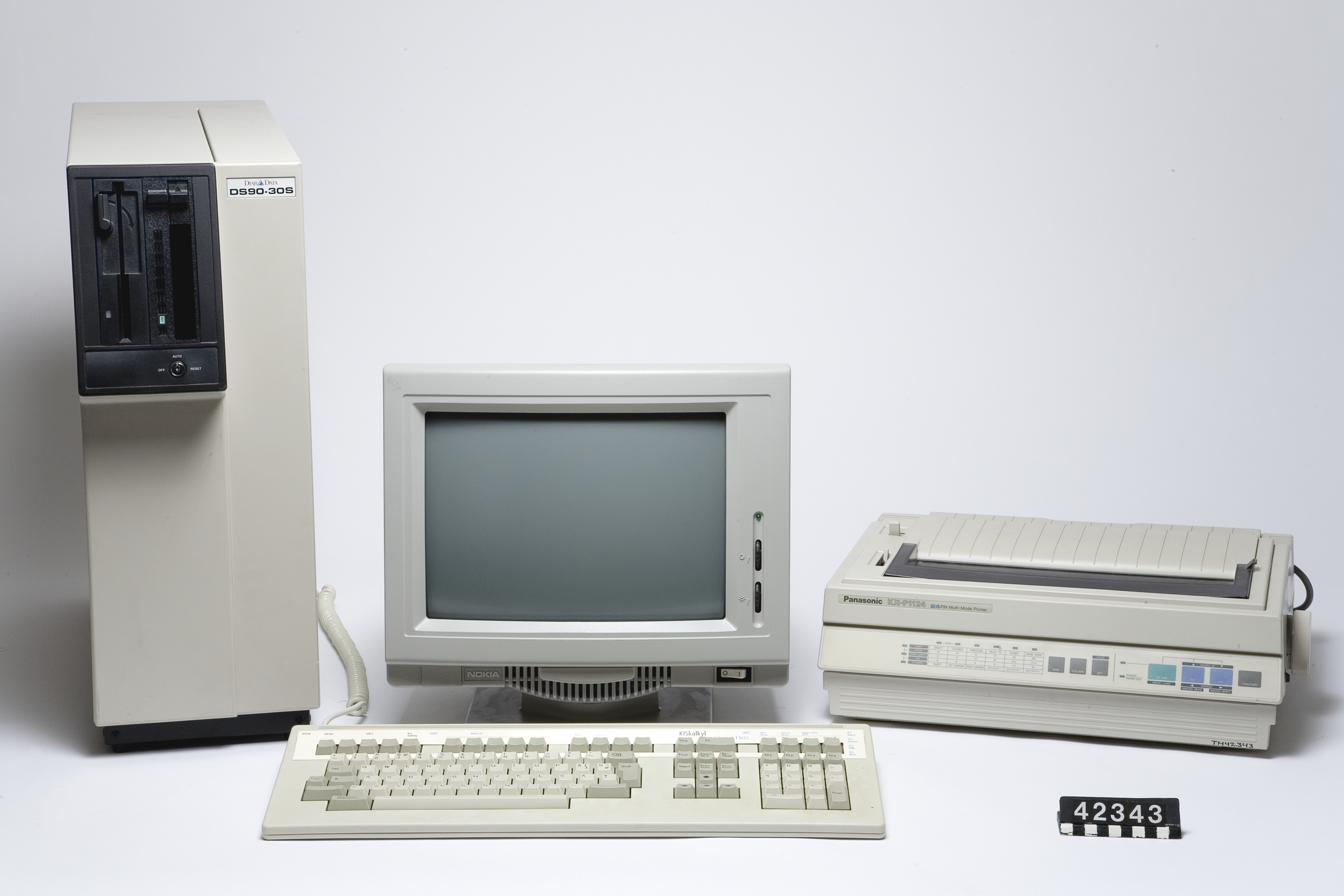
DIAB DS90 UNIX-system from the collections of the Swedish National Museum of Science and Technology

Dataindustrier AB (literal translation: computer industries shareholding company) or DIAB was a Swedish computer engineering and manufacturing firm, founded in 1970 by Lars Karlsson and active in the 1970s through 1990s. The company's first product was a board-based computer centered on a specific bus named Data Board 4680. This unit was used for automatic control in several Swedish industries as would be almost all of DIAB's computers. DIAB is mostly known for engineering the ABC 80, the first Swedish home computer, manufactured by Luxor AB.

They would subsequently develop all the ABC-models (ABC 800, ABC 1600 and ABC 9000) before rebranding their own make of the ABC 9000 as DIAB DS-90 and develop a series of Unix-compatible computers, using code licensed from AT&T Version 5 Unix release, but with a unique in-house kernel using the brand name DNIX. DIAB would continue to provide OEM services past Luxor AB, the most prominent probably being the entire Unix server product line from Cromemco.

The compiler technology developed by Tomas Evensen at DIAB was bought by Wind River Systems and was renamed to the "Wind River Compiler". Further information about the Wind River Compiler can be found at the Wind River Compiler product home page.

The Unix computer support and customers was acquired by Bull Computer in 1990 ending the history of the company.

== Product line ==
=== Card-based microcomputers ===
- 1974: Data Board 4680 - the number is a short form of the three microprocessors supported by the bus of this system: Intel 4004, Motorola 6800 and Zilog Z80. Eventually only Z80 was ever used in this product.

=== Home and office computers ===
- 1977: 7S "Seven S" a combined monochrome terminal and computer built on the Data Board 4680 bus and a Z80 processor.
- 1978: ABC 80 a Z80-based monochrome home computer.
- 1983: ABC 800 an enhanced office and home computer, 32 KB RAM, also based on Z80, with color graphics.
- 1983: ABC 802 a variant of ABC 800 with 64 KB RAM whereof 32 KB were used as a RAM disk.
- 1983: ABC 806 a variant of ABC 800 with 160 KB RAM whereof 128 were used as a RAM disk.

== Peripherals ==
- 1982: ABC 838 – 2× 8-inch 1 MB floppy drive
- 1982: ABC 830 – 2× 5.25-inch 160 kB floppy drive
- 1982: ABC 890 – 8× ABC-bus slot expansion
- 1982: ABC 815 – 14-inch monochrome screen
- 1983: ABC 812 – 14-inch colour screen
- 1983: ABC 850 – 10 MB hard disc and 640 kB floppy disc as well as 8× ABC-bus slots
- 1984: ABC 834 – 2× 5.25-inch 640 kB floppy drive, compact version. Introduction price at 12000 SEK.
- 1985: ABC 1656 – 40–80 MB hard disc and tape drive for backup
- 1985: ABC 1615 – 1024 × 768 pixel screen
- ABC 820 – Compact Cassette storage (for ABC 80)
- ABC 821 – Compact Cassette storage (for ABC 80, 800, 802)
- ABC 22 – Function and numeric-only keyboard
- ABC-55 – Keyboard
- ABC-77 – Keyboard
- ABC-99 – Keyboard
- ABC R8 – Mouse
- LUX-NET – 50 computer, 1000-meter range, 500 kbit/s, EIA-422 external networking adapter

=== UNIX computers ===
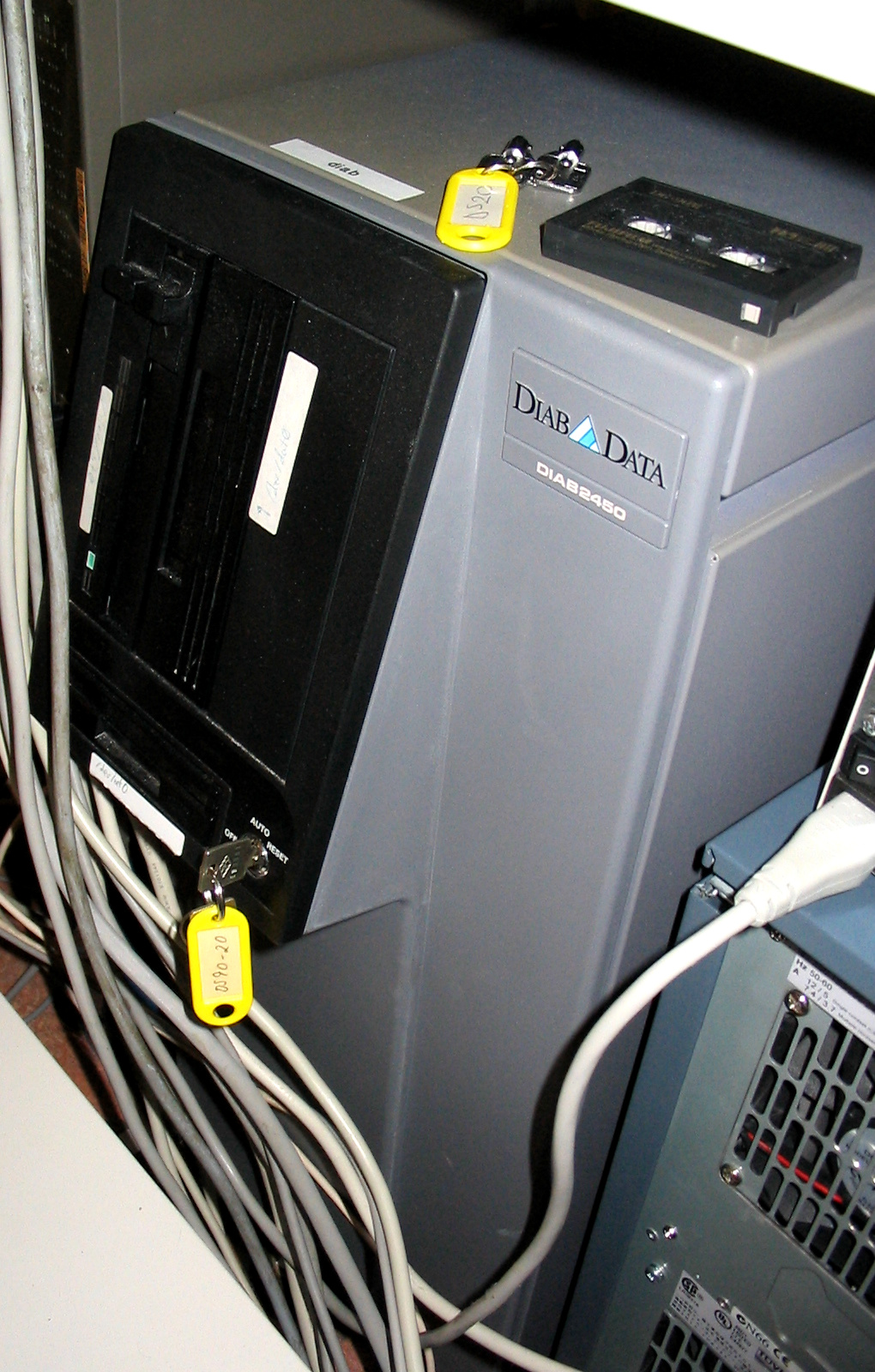
DIAB Data DIAB2450

In 1983, DIAB independently developed the first UNIX-compatible machine, DIAB DS90, based on the Motorola 68000 CPU. DNIX here made its appearance, based on a UNIX System V license from AT&T. DIAB was however an industrial automation company, and needed a real-time operating system, so the company replaced the AT&T-supplied UNIX kernel with their own in-house developed, yet compatible real-time variant. Over time, the company also replaced several of the UNIX standard userspace tools with their own implementations, to the point where no code was derived from UNIX, and their machines could be deployed independently of any AT&T UNIX license. Two years later and in cooperation with Luxor, a computer called ABC 1200 was developed for the office market, while in parallel, DIAB continue to produce enhanced versions of the DS90 computer using newer versions of the Motorola CPUs such as the Motorola 68010, 68020, 68030 and eventually 68040. In 1990, after DIAB was acquired by Groupe Bull, who continued to produce and support the DS machines under the brand name DIAB, with names such as DIAB 2320, DIAB 2340 etc., still running DIABs version of DNIX.

- 1985: ABC 1600 a personal computer running ABCenix
- 1985: ABC 9000 really a DS90 in disguise, running DNIX
- 1985: beginning of the DS90-line
  - DS90-00, DS90-10, DS90-11, Motorola 68010-based UNIX servers intended for use via terminals
  - DS90-20, DS90-21, quad Motorola 68020-based computers
  - DS90-30, DS90-30S, DS90-31, dual Motorola 68030-based computers
  - DS101, actually a DS90-31 with exterior design by pop-artist Richard Hamilton
  - DS90-41, DS90-45, DS90-47, Motorola 68040-based computers
- the DIAB line; these are actually partly rebranded DSnn-computers:
  - DIAB2320, DIAB2340, Motorola 68030-based sequels to the DS90-31
  - DIAB2420, DIAB2440, DIAB2450, Motorola 68040-based sequels to the DS90-47
  - DIAB9030, DIAB9031 – even later computers of unknown construction
- OEM products based on DIAB UNIX computers:
  - Dynatech Computer Systems (Cromemco) DCS-1/200: based on DS90-30. The Cromix UNIX dialect used in these systems is likewise simply a rebranded DNIX.
  - Dynatech Computer Systems (Cromemco) DCS-1/300: based on DS90-31
  - Dynatech Computer Systems (Cromemco) DCS-1/400
  - Dynatech Computer Systems (Cromemco) DCS-4/300: based on DIAB2450
  - Dynatech Computer Systems (Cromemco) DCS-4/400: based on DS90-41
  - Ohio Scientific – this company is known to have made at least one OEM computer based on DS90-00 hardware, model number(s) unknown.
  - Norsk Data – also made a DS90-00 OEM computers, likewise details unknown.
  - ISC Systems Corporation DNP-10: based on DS90-10
