= List of computers with on-board BASIC =

This is a list of computers with on-board BASIC. They shipped standard with a version of BASIC that was installed in the computer. The computers can access the BASIC language without the user inserting cartridges or loading software from external media.

Make	Model	Version	Author	Bitwise Ops	FOR/NEXT Skip	Numeric Support	Variable Name Length	Tokenization
Acorn	Atom	Atom BASIC, BBC BASIC I (Upgrade ROM)						
Acorn	Electron	BBC BASIC II	Sophie Wilson	Yes	No	I:32; FP:32/8		Partial
Acorn	BBC Micro	BBC BASIC I, II, III	Sophie Wilson	Yes	No	I:32; FP:32/8		Partial
Acorn	BBC Master	BBC BASIC IV	Sophie Wilson	Yes	No	I:32; FP:32/8		Partial
Acorn	BBC Master Compact	BBC BASIC IV (Recoded Maths Routines)	Sophie Wilson	Yes	No	I:32; FP:32/8		Partial
Acorn	Archimedes	BBC BASIC V		Yes	No			Partial
Acorn	Risc PC	BBC BASIC VI		Yes	No			Partial
Amstrad	CPC 464	Locomotive BASIC 1.0	Locomotive Software		Yes			Partial
Amstrad	CPC 6128	Locomotive BASIC 1.1	Locomotive Software		Yes			Partial
Amstrad	NC 100	BBC BASIC	Richard Russell?	Yes	No			
Amstrad	NC 150	BBC BASIC	Richard Russell?	Yes	No			
Amstrad	NC 200	BBC BASIC	Richard Russell?	Yes	No			
Apple	Apple II	Integer	Steve Wozniak	No	No	I		Full
Apple	Apple II	Applesoft	Microsoft	No	No	I:16,FP:31/8	2	Full
Applied Technology	MicroBee	MicroWorld BASIC	Matthew Starr	No	Yes	FP		
Atari, Inc.	600XL, 800XL	Atari BASIC Rev. B or C	Shepardson Microsystems	No	No		120	Full
Atari Corporation	65XE, 130XE, 800XE, XEGS	Atari BASIC Rev. C	Shepardson Microsystems	No	No		120	Full
Cambridge Computer	Z88	BBC BASIC		Yes	No			
Commodore	PET	Commodore BASIC 1.0, 2.0, 4.0	Microsoft	Yes	No			
Commodore	CBM 4000/8000	Commodore BASIC 4.0	Microsoft	Yes	No			
Commodore	VIC-20	Commodore BASIC 2.0	Microsoft	Yes	No			
Commodore	Commodore 64	Commodore BASIC 2.0	Microsoft	Yes	No		2	Partial
Commodore	C16	Commodore BASIC 3.5	Microsoft	Yes	No			
Commodore	Plus/4	Commodore BASIC 3.5	Microsoft	Yes	No			
Commodore	C128	Commodore BASIC 7.0	Microsoft	Yes	No			
Compukit	UK101		Microsoft	No				
Hewlett-Packard	Series 80		Hewlett-Packard	No		I:32,FP:64	2	Full
IBM	PC 5150	Cassette BASIC	Microsoft	Yes	Yes		40	Partial
IBM	XT 5160		Microsoft	Yes	Yes			
IBM	PS/2		Microsoft	Yes	Yes			
Luxor AB	ABC 80		DIAB	Yes	Yes	I:16/FP	2	Full
Luxor AB	ABC 800	BASIC II	DIAB	Yes	Yes	I:16; FP 32 or 64 bits		
Luxor AB	ABC 802	BASIC II	DIAB	Yes	Yes	I:16; FP 32 or 64 bits		
Luxor AB	ABC 806	BASIC II	DIAB	Yes	Yes	I:16; FP 32 or 64 bits		
Mattel	Aquarius							
Various	MSX, MSX2, MSX2+, MSX tR	MSX-BASIC v1.0 - v4.0	Microsoft	Yes	No	I:16; FP 32 or 64 bits	2	Partial
NEC	PC-6001	N60-BASIC	NEC/Microsoft					
NEC	PC-8001	N-BASIC	NEC/Microsoft					
NEC	PC-8801	N88-BASIC and N-BASIC	NEC/Microsoft					
NEC	PC-9801	N88-BASIC	NEC/Microsoft					
NEC	PC-9821	N88-BASIC (86 Version)	NEC/Microsoft					
Panasonic	JR-200	JR-BASIC						
Radio Shack	TRS-80 Model 1	Level I	Li-Chen Wang					
Radio Shack	TRS-80 Model 1	Level II	Microsoft	Yes	Yes	I:16; FP 32 or 64 bits		Full
Radio Shack	TRS-80 Model III	Level I						
Radio Shack	TRS-80 Model III	Level II	Microsoft	Yes	Yes	I:16; FP 32 or 64 bits		Full
Radio Shack	TRS-80 Model 4	Level II	Microsoft	Yes	Yes	I:16; FP 32 or 64 bits		Full
Radio Shack	TRS-80 Model 4D	Level II	Microsoft	Yes	Yes	I:16; FP 32 or 64 bits		Full
Radio Shack	TRS-80 Pocket Computer PC-1							
Radio Shack	TRS-80 PC-2							
Radio Shack	TRS-80 PC-3							
Radio Shack	TRS-80 PC-4							
Radio Shack	TRS-80 CoCo		Microsoft	Yes	Yes	I:16; FP 32 or 64 bits		Full
Radio Shack	TRS-80 CoCo 2		Microsoft	Yes	Yes	I:16; FP 32 or 64 bits		Full
Radio Shack	TRS-80 CoCo 3		Microsoft	Yes	Yes	I:16; FP 32 or 64 bits		Full
Radio Shack	TRS-80 M100		Microsoft	Yes	Yes	I:16; FP 32 or 64 bits		Full
Radio Shack	TRS-80 M102		Microsoft	Yes	Yes	I:16; FP 32 or 64 bits		Full
Radio Shack	TRS-80 MC-10		Microsoft	Yes	No	FP	2	Partial
Sharp	PC-1500				No			Full
Sinclair	ZX80	Sinclair BASIC 4k	Nine Tiles Networks					
Sinclair	ZX81	Sinclair BASIC 8k	Nine Tiles Networks	No	Yes			Partial
Sinclair	ZX Spectrum	Sinclair BASIC 48	Nine Tiles Networks	No	Yes			Partial
Sinclair	ZX Spectrum +	Sinclair BASIC 48	Nine Tiles Networks					
Sinclair	ZX Spectrum 128	Sinclair BASIC 128 and 48	Nine Tiles Networks					
Sinclair	ZX Spectrum +2	Sinclair BASIC 128 and 48	Nine Tiles Networks	No	Yes			Partial
Sinclair	ZX Spectrum +3	Sinclair BASIC +3 and 48	Nine Tiles Networks					
Tangerine Computer Systems	Oric-1			Yes	No		2	Partial
Texas Instruments	TI-99/4A	TI BASIC		No	No			Full
Texas Instruments	Compact Computer 40			Yes			2	Full
Wang	Wang 2300	Wang BASIC						
Wang	Wang 2200	Wang BASIC						
Wang	Wang 2200VP	Wang BASIC-2						

BASICs with Bitwise Ops use -1 as true and the AND and OR operators perform a bitwise operation on the arguments.

FOR/NEXT skip means that body of the loop is skipped if the initial value of the loop times the sign of the step exceeds the final value times the sign of the step (such as 2 TO 1 STEP 1 or 1 TO 2 STEP -1). The statements inside the FOR/NEXT loop will not be executed at all.

Numeric support indicates if a BASIC supports Integers and/or Floating Point.

Variable Name Length is how many characters of a variable name are used to determine uniqueness.

Full tokenization means that all keywords are converted to tokens and all extra space characters are removed. Partial tokenization leaves extra space characters in the source. None means that no tokenization is done. How to test for full tokenization:

10 PRINT         "HELLO"
LIST

If it is fully tokenized it should return 10 PRINT "HELLO" without all the extra spaces that were entered.
