= MRVC =

MRVC may refer to:

- Mumbai Railway Vikas Corporation
- Missouri River Valley Conference, a Missouri high schools athletic conference

== See also ==
- MRV Communications
