= Conserver =

Serial console management system

- Developer(s): Bryan Stansell
- Stable release: 8.2.7 / July 7, 2022; 2 years ago
- Repository: github.com/conserver/conserver
- Operating system: Cross-platform
- Platform: Unix, Linux, Windows
- Type: Network management Out-of-band management System administration
- License: BSD
- Website: www.conserver.com

Conserver is a serial console management system that provides remote access to system consoles and logs to a central (master) host. It supports both local and network serial connections and allows replay of the server console history even if the server is down. Multiple users can connect to a single serial connection, with one having write-access.

== History ==
"Console server" as it was originally known, was written by Tom Fine, and was presented with source code to the world at large during LISA IV, in Colorado Springs in 1990. A similar program had previously been written at Purdue University. Those authors assumed that Fine's code was based on their version, so forked Fine's code, modified it and released it as version 8. This forked into different versions (generally v8.<something>) used by Sun Microsystems, IBM, and numerous others. Bryan Stansell later merged the forks with most features and added TCP Wrapper access control, SSL encryption, UDS networking and PAM authentication support; as well as accepting patches submitted by others.

== Modern usage ==
The conserver was written to be used with RS-232 serial wired multi-port cards. Modern day setups (generally) use separate management Ethernet networks and console servers. In some cases some form of reverse telnet or SSH connection is used; alternatively, an additional level of indirection can be interposed: the server provides a Serial over LAN service via IPMI, and a command-line utility connects to the server. This socket can then be used as a "virtual reverse telnet" connection. conserver is not limited to any one form of network protocol, and can handle these setups, as well as log the console output of virtual machines.

Conserver is generally used in computer cluster setups too, logging messages either via a terminal server or with an instance running on every node monitoring the console of the next machine, known as daisy-chaining.

== See also ==
- Console server
- Out-of-band management
