= ABC 1600 =

Early personal computer

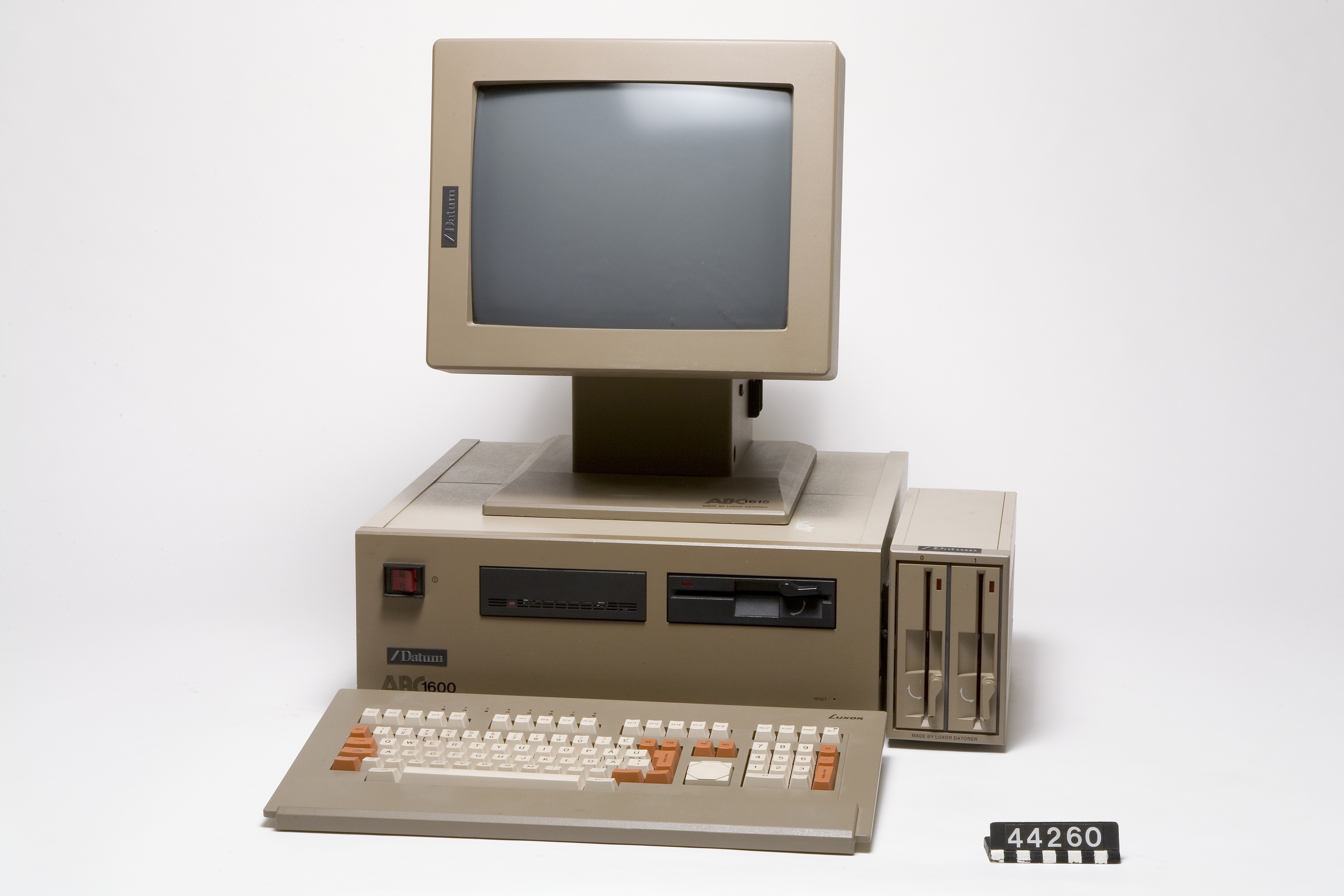
- ABC 1600 in the collections of Swedish National Museum of Science and Technology
- Type: Personal computer
- Release date: 1985
- Introductory price: 47,125 SEK + VAT (≈5,890 USD)
- Operating system: ABCenix
- CPU: Motorola 68008 8 MHz
- Memory: 1 MB (16 KB ROM)
- Graphics: Graphics 1024×768 1-bpp; Text (videotex) portrait – 73×80, character 7×9; Landscape – 25×80, character 9×13
- Sound: Beep
- Connectivity: 2× RS 232C, keyboard, external hard drive (floppy drive), monitor, printer, 4 expansion slots, TV
- Predecessor: ABC 800

The ABC 1600 was a personal computer from Luxor that was introduced in 1985. It was built around the Motorola 68008 processor, had 1 megabyte of memory and used the operating system ABCenix, a Unix-like system developed from DNIX.

The ABC 1600 used monochrome graphics with a display resolution of 1024 × 768 and the screen could be turned 90° while in use depending on whether the user desired to work in standing (portrait) or horizontal (landscape) format. The hard disk had a capacity of 13 MB and the 5.25-inch floppy disk drive stored 640 KB.

The ABC 1656 was a 1600 model with a hard disk capacity of 40 MB or 80 MB instead.

== See also ==
- ABC 80
- ABC 800
