= Avocent =

Avocent Corporation
- Type: Subsidiary
- Founded: 2000; 26 years ago
- Fate: Acquired
- Headquarters: Huntsville, Alabama, U.S.
- Products: KVM switches, serial consoles, IT infrastructure products
- Parent: Vertiv
- Website: vertiv.com

Avocent Corporation was an information-technology products manufacturer headquartered in Huntsville, Alabama. Avocent formed in 2000 from the merger of the world's two largest manufacturers of KVM (keyboard, video and mouse) equipment, Apex and Cybex Computer Products Corporation. As of August 2006, the company employed more than 1,800 people worldwide.

On October 6, 2009, it was announced that Emerson Electric would buy Avocent for $1.2 billion USD. The tender was finalized on December 11, resulting in Avocent becoming part of Emerson Network Power, a division of Emerson Electric. On August 2, 2016, Emerson announced an agreement to sell Network Power to Platinum Equity. Emerson Network Power was rebranded as Vertiv.

Since 2016, Avocent has operated as a subsidiary of Vertiv.

== Product range ==
Avocent focuses on out-of-band infrastructure management within the following fields:

1. Server management
2. Power management
3. Service-processor management
4. Console-server management
5. KVM management
6. IPMI for OEM partners
7. A wide range of embedded-software
8. Desktop management
9. ITIL market
10. IT service management

Avocent's product development has spanned three eras:

1. the growth of the analog KVM switch – paralleling the growth of server architecture in the data center
2. the growth of the digital KVM switch – enabling the remote control of geographically dispersed data-centers
3. the diversification and "management" phase (revolving around the acquisition of LANDesk (2006) and Touchpaper software (2008) and the capabilities they provide)

== Acquisitions ==
Avocent's history of acquisitions includes:

- 2001 – Equinox Systems, the makers of various serial communications devices.
- 2002 – 2C Computing, which focused on PCI-bus extension, suitable to remotely connect office users to datacenter-housed PCs.
- 2003 – Soronti, Inc., makers of KVM over IP technology.
- 2004 – Crystal Link Technologies, OSA Technologies, Inc., and Sonic Mobility, Inc.
- 2006 – Cyclades Corporation and LANDesk Software.
- 2008 – Touchpaper Software and Ergo 2000, an LCD rack-based console maker.
