= Equinox Systems =

American networking hardware manufacturer

Equinox Systems, Inc.
- Company type: Public
- Industry: Computer networking
- Founded: March 1983; 43 years ago in Miami-Dade County, Florida, United States
- Founders: Bill Dambrackas; Mark Cole; Kevin Doren
- Defunct: January 2001; 25 years ago
- Fate: Acquired by Avocent
- Number of employees: 100 (1995)
- Website: equinox.com at the Wayback Machine (archived 1996-11-04)

Equinox Systems, Inc., was an American manufacturer of computer networking hardware and developer of networking software based in Miami, Florida, and active from 1983 to 2000. The company started out selling a well-regarded series of enterprise digital PBX systems for data transmissions in the early 1980s, before becoming a major vendor and OEM of modems, Ethernet network switches, and advanced serial communication cards in the 1990s. Equinox was eventually acquired by Avocent of Huntsville, Alabama, in 2000, who kept the company around as a subsidiary for several years.

== History ==
=== Foundation (1983–1985) ===
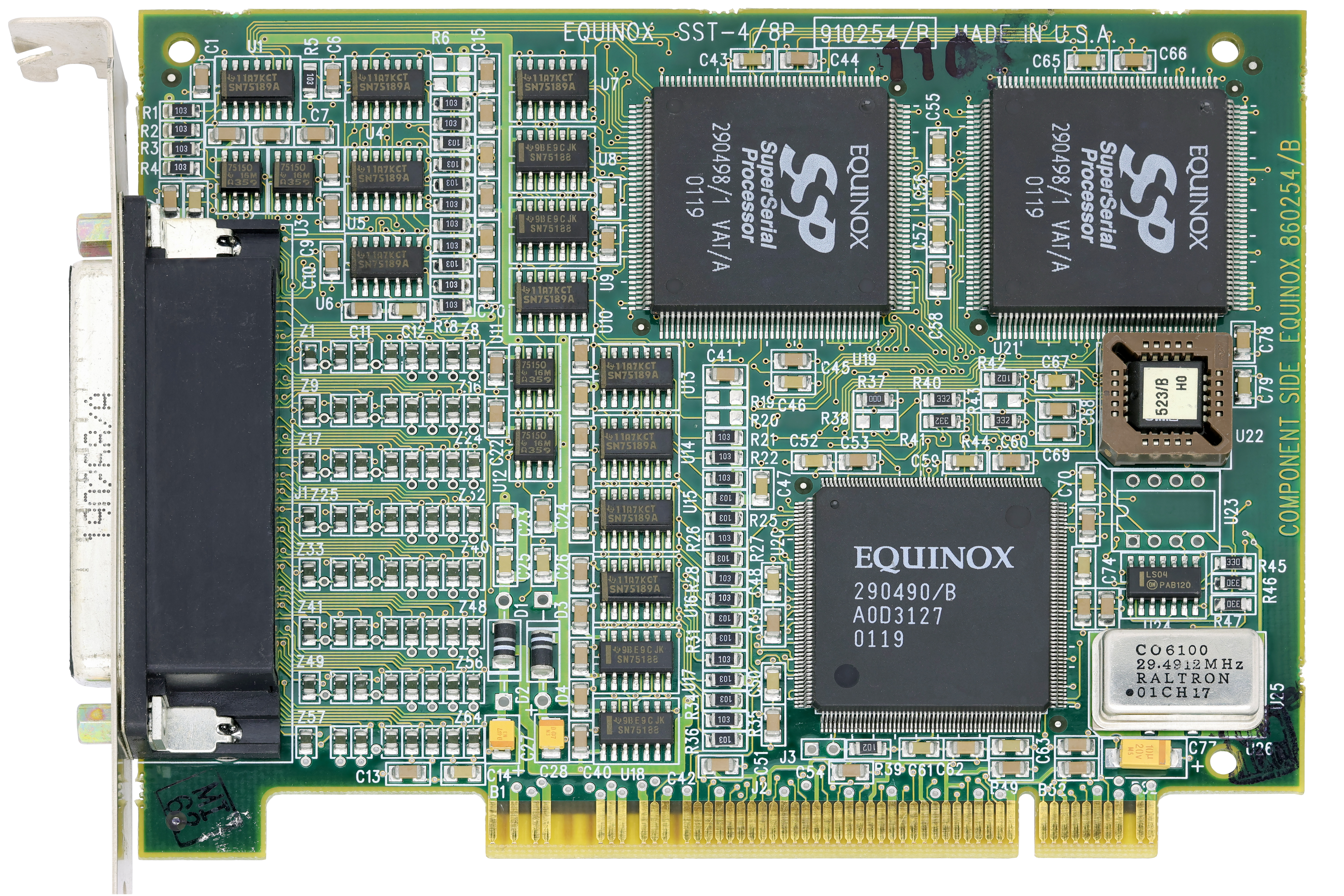
Front view of an Equinox SST-4 8P, PCI-based multi-port serial controller card

Equinox Systems was founded in Miami-Dade County, Florida, in 1983 by Bill Dambrackas, Mark Cole, and Kevin Doren. Dambrackas and Cole had previously worked for Racal-Milgo, a manufacturer of modems and other telecommunications equipment that had offices in South Miami-Dade. Racal-Milgo announced its intent to move 40 miles north to Broward County in 1982, to the chagrin of Dambrackas and Cole, who did not want to relocate their families in order to keep their jobs. In early 1983, they obtained $1.1 million in financial backing from TA Associates, a Boston-based investment firm, and in March 1983, they formally incorporated Equinox Systems, named so after the March equinox ongoing at the time of the company's foundation. The company was soon joined by eight other former employees of Racal-Milgo who also wanted to avoid moving northward, and by November 1983, Equinox had ten employees on its payroll.

Equinox's first product, a data PBX, was released to market in early 1984, retailing for US$30,000. Data PBXes were a form of private branch exchange developed in the 1970s, which facilitated communications between data terminals and minicomputers and between personal computers and certain peripherals such as modems and printers. Data PBXes were once common in non-IBM shops, but they were prone to collisions and became antiquated in the early 1980s amid rapid developments in Ethernet-based local area networking. Nevertheless, some companies with wide area networks liked data PBXes due to their interoperability with older computer equipment and lower cost, compared to setting up newer cutting-edge Ethernet-based LANs. Despite the circumstances of its founding, Equinox avoided competing directly with Racal-Milgo, instead targeting the California-based Micom, who cornered 40 percent of the data PBX market.

Equinox's data PBX in proved a hot-seller, the company gaining large corporations as customers; among its clientele in 1985 Intel, Bell South, the University of Louisville, AT&T, Toys "R" Us, GTE, Chase Bank, and Sprint. Despite its popularity, the company posted losses of $432,000 and $281,000 in 1983 and 1984 respectively, this in spite of the company receiving $3 million in further financing from multiple venture capital firms, including Hambrecht & Quist, in early 1984.

=== Profitability and growth (1985–1992) ===
In 1985, the company received $2.5 million in capital from Oak Investment Partners; Digital Equipment Corporation (DEC), a major enterprise computer company based in Massachusetts, also invested $500,000 in Equinox that year. That year, Equinox posted its first profitable financial quarters. In March 1986, by which point the company employed 100, Equinox expanded their lease in the business park where they were headquartered from 25,000 square feet to 57,000 square feet, in anticipation of a doubling of their workforce. In 1989, the company introduced its first Ethernet-based product with the ELS-48 terminal server and the ELG-48 gateway, both of which were based on DEC's Local Area Transport networking technology.

In a dramatic twist of fate, Equinox was forced to re-establish itself in Broward County, near the founders' ex-employer Racal-Milgo, after Equinox's South Dade headquarters were destroyed by Hurricane Andrew in August 1992. The hurricane had ripped the roof off of Equinox's main building, flooding the administrative office, destroying 90 percent of its computer systems, and totaling $2 million worth of completed inventory. The company was saved by mission-critical documents and electronic data having been stored safely offsite. In October 1992, Encore Computer, a Massachusetts-based company who had offices in Plantation, Florida, offered Equinox temporary office space for a diminished lease. Equinox's move to Plantation in Broward was later made permanent. In 1994, Equinox purchased the remaining floor space of the Plantation office formerly occupied by Encore, who had since moved out.

=== IPO and decline (1992–2000) ===
The company considered going public in 1986, but it delayed this move until March 1993, when it issued its initial public offering. The IPO soon went sour, Equinox's share price dropping from a high of $11.50 in March to $3.75 in January 1994. At the time of its IPO, Hambrecht & Quist's 3.9-percent stake in Equinox was valued at $1.7 million, but by the following January, the same stake was worth $544,000, not much higher than its initial $500,000 investment back in 1984. This drop prompted The New York Times to call Equinox one of 1993's riskier investments.

In February 1995, the company announced its raising of a 45,000-square-foot office building, on seven acres of land, in Sunrise, Florida, serving as its new headquarters. By this point the company had stabilized at 100 employees. The move to Sunset was completed by early 1997. Equinox peaked in the late 1990s, reporting record earnings between 1997 and 1999, before the company was hit hard again in 2000.

=== Acquisition (2000–2003) ===
In November 2000, Avocent Corporation, a multinational data center equipment vendor headquartered in Huntsville, Alabama, announced their acquisition of Equinox for $57 million. The acquisition was finalized in January 2001. Equinox remained a subsidiary of Avocent for several years.
