= Local Area Transport =

Computer network protocol

Local Area Transport (LAT) is a non-routable (data link layer) networking technology developed by Digital Equipment Corporation to provide connection between the DECserver terminal servers and Digital's VAX and Alpha and MIPS host computers via Ethernet, giving communication between those hosts and serial devices such as video terminals and printers. The protocol itself was designed in such a manner as to maximize packet efficiency over Ethernet by bundling multiple characters from multiple ports into a single packet for Ethernet transport.

One LAT strength was efficiently handling time-sensitive data transmission. Over time, other host implementations of the LAT protocol appeared allowing communications to a wide range of Unix and other non-Digital operating systems using the LAT protocol.

== History ==
In 1984, the first implementation of the LAT protocol connected a terminal server to a VMS VAX-Cluster in Spit Brook Road, Nashua, NH. By "virtualizing" the terminal port at the host end, a very large number of plug-and-play VT100-class terminals could connect to each host computer system. Additionally, a single physical terminal could connect via multiple sessions to multiple hosts simultaneously. Future generations of terminal servers included both LAT and TELNET protocols, one of the earliest protocols created to run on a burgeoning TCP/IP based Internet. Additionally, the ability to create reverse direction pathways from users to non-traditional RS232 devices (i.e. UNIX Host TTYS1 operator ports) created an entirely new market for Terminal Servers, now known as console servers in the mid to late 1990s, year 2000 and beyond through today.

LAT and VMS drove the initial surge of adoption of thick Ethernet by the computer industry. By 1986, terminal server networks accounted for 10% of Digital's $10 billion revenue. These early Ethernet LANs scaled using Ethernet bridges (another DEC invention) as well as DECnet routers. Subsequently, Cisco routers, which implemented TCP-IP and DECnet, emerged as a global connection between these packet-based Ethernet LANs.

Over time, when terminals became less popular, terminal emulators had a built-in LAT client.

== LAT features ==
If a computer communicating via LAT doesn't receive an acknowledgment within 80 milliseconds for a packet it transmitted, it resends that packet; this can clog a network. No data is sent if no data is offered and under heavy loads LAT limits the number of packets sent per second to twenty-four: twelve transmits and twelve receives. As more characters are sent, the packets get bigger but not more numerous. Above 80 milliseconds latency a touch typist will notice the sluggish character echo. The LAT 80 millisecond delay offloads both the network by sending fewer larger packets which also reduces interrupts at each system.

== Early terminal server vendors ==
- Digital Equipment Corporation - primarily via their DECserver systems.
- Able Computer - An early provider of Terminal Server products.
- Chase Research - A Europe-based early provider of Terminal Server products.
- Cisco Systems - Provided LAT on Terminal Servers as early as 1990.
- Emulex Corporation - A California-based early provider of Terminal Server products that included X.25 and 3270 features; they sold through Datability and other OEMs.
- Equinox Systems - A Florida-based early provider of Terminal Server products.
- Hughes LAN Systems - Provided LAT capability in 1989.
- Interlink Computer Sciences, an early 1990 LAT vendor.
- Xylogics Corporation - An early provider of DEC ecosystem products including terminal servers based in Massachusetts.
- Xyplex Corporation - An early provider of Terminal Server products based in Massachusetts.

== Open Source solutions ==
Most Linux distributions offer a client and server lat package, that can easily be installed via a package manager. This allows e.g. to access a local area network server while being connected to a corporate VPN network that would otherwise block local TCP/IP traffic.

== See also ==
- Terminal server - An active device to connect serial devices to Local Area Networks
- Console server - An active device to connect LAN attached users to Linux/Unix server operator ports
