= Reverse telnet =

Reverse telnet is a specialized application of telnet, where the server side of the connection reads and writes data to a computer terminal line (RS-232 serial port), rather than providing a command shell to the host device. Typically, reverse telnet is implemented on an embedded device (e.g. terminal/console server), which has an Ethernet network interface and serial port(s). Through the use of reverse telnet on such a device, IP-networked users can use telnet to access serially-connected devices.

Reverse telnet can be used to connect to modems or other external asynchronous devices. It is also used to connect to the console port of a router, a switch or other device.

== Example ==
On the client, the command line for initiating a "reverse telnet" connection might look like this:

telnet 172.16.1.254 2002

(The syntax in the above example would be valid for the command-line telnet client packaged with many operating systems, including most Unix operating systems, or available as an option or add-on.)

In this example, 172.16.1.254 is the IP address of the console device, and 2002 is the TCP port associated with a terminal line on the server.

== See also ==
- Terminal server
- Console server
