= Xyplex =

Xyplex Networks, Inc.
- Founded: 1981
- Defunct: 1994
- Fate: Acquired by Raytheon
- Website: xyplex.com at the Wayback Machine (archived 1999-02-08)

Xyplex Networks, Inc. was a computer networking company. Their key products included networking hubs, switches, routers and remote access servers.

The company was founded in 1981, and acquired by Raytheon in 1994. It was then sold to Whittaker Corporation in 1996. In 1998, the company was bought by MRV Communications.
