= MRV Communications =

American company

MRV Communications Inc.
- Company type: Subsidiary
- Industry: Telecommunications
- Founded: 1988
- Headquarters: Chatsworth, California, U.S.
- Products: Packet and Optical products
- Website: mrv.com at the Wayback Machine (archived 2016-03-03)

MRV Communications was a telecommunications company based in Chatsworth, California. MRV Communications was acquired by ADVA Optical Networking on August 14, 2017 for a reported $69 million.

== History ==
MRV was founded in 1988 by Shlomo Margalit and Zeev Rav-Noy as a maker of Metro and Access optoelectronic components. MRV also established the subsidiary LuminentOIC, who makes fiber-to-the-premises (FTTP) components.

=== Product development ===
In the 1990s, MRV produced Ethernet switching and Optical Transport for Metro and campus environments. MRV began building switches and routers used by carriers implementing Metro Ethernet networks that provide Ethernet services to enterprise customers and multi-dwelling residential buildings.

In 1999, MRV was named as the prime vendor to deploy the world’s first Metro Ethernet national network in Swedish Telecom. That same year the company introduced a Linux-based IP router based on network processor technology.

The company introduced the industry's first Packet-Optical platform with integrated IP/MPLS/Ethernet and WDM technologies in 2005, and got MEF CE 1.0 certification.

In 2008, they introduced the industry's first purpose-built 10GE demarcation device for Carrier Ethernet Access services.

In 2009, MRV Technologies deployed OptiSwitch Ethernet demarcation in the industry’s first 4G LTE commercial Mobile Backhaul network and introduced one of the lowest-latency optical products (Fiber Driver) for High-Frequency Trading.

In 2010, the company introduced industry first Physical layer 10G switch for the lab automation market.

The company was among the first vendors in the industry to pass MEF CE 2.0 certification in 2012.

In 2014, they introduced a new flagship next-generation WDM metro product line, the OptiDriver series and in 2015 introduced the industry’s first 100G purpose-built CE 2.0 NID, OptiPacket.

In 2015, the company introduced the industry's first 100G purpose-built CE 2.0 NID, OptiPacket.

=== Acquisitions and investments ===
In 1992, MRV acquired Galcom Networking, a company based in Tel Aviv, Israel.

MRV Communications acquired Fibronics International from Elbit Ltd. in 1996. A year later, the company acquired Interdata, a French-based system integrator specializing in optical networks, architecture, and network security for operators, enterprises, and large jurisdictions.

In 1998, the company paid $35 million for Xyplex Networks. This acquisition enhanced the development of remote management and IP routing functionality for WAN services and added distribution channels in the United States and Europe.

In 2001, the company acquired Alcadon AB, a Nordic-based system integrator of passive and active optical networking infrastructure.

In 2010, the company announced the sale of Source Photonics, Inc. to Francisco Partners. MRV Technologies sold Alcadon AB, a Nordic-based system integrator of passive and active optical networking infrastructure, to Deltaco AB in 2012.
