= ABC 800 =

Office versions of ABC 80 home computer

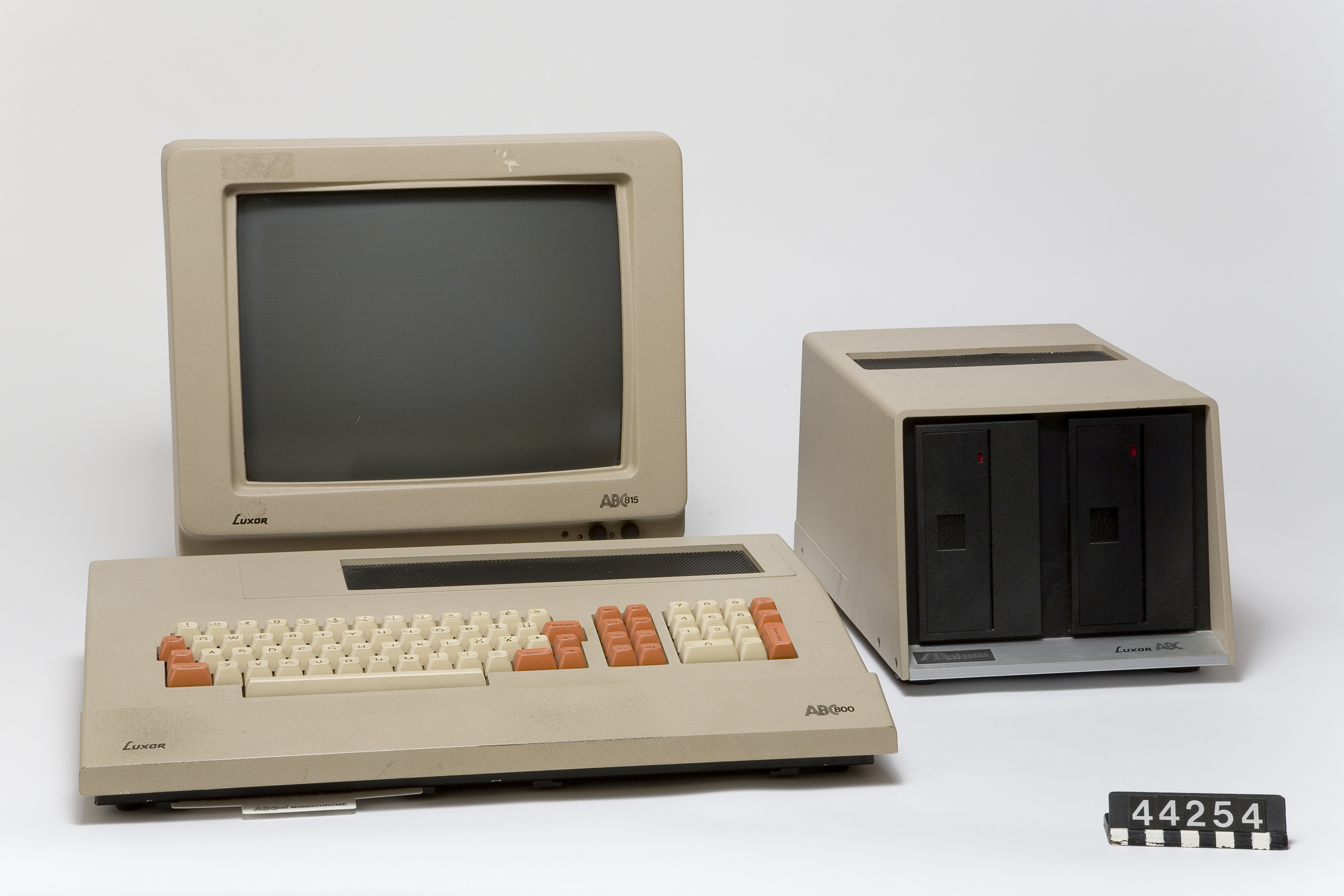
- Luxor ABC 800 computer in the collections of Swedish National Museum of Science and Technology
- Manufacturer: Luxor in Motala, Sweden
- Type: Personal computer
- Release date: 1981
- Introductory price: 9,800 SEK (1982) (ex.VAT)
- Operating system: 24 KB ROM for BASIC II
- CPU: 8-bit Zilog Z80A @ 3 MHz
- Memory: 32 KB ROM + 32 KB RAM
- Graphics: Text mode 80×24 colour Teletext, 78×75 block graphics or 240×240 at 2 bpp, 512×240 at 4 bpp, 256×240 at 4 bpp with red, green, blue, yellow, cyan, magenta, white and black
- Sound: Beep, within the keyboard
- Connectivity: 2x serial (75 - 19,200 baud) DE-9, 2x32-pin eurocard 4680 bus connector, video DA-15, keyboard DIN-7

The Luxor ABC 800 series are office versions of the ABC 80 home computer. They featured an enhanced BASIC interpreter, and more memory: 32 kilobytes RAM and 32 KB ROM was now standard. The Z80 is clocked at 3 MHz. It featured 40×24 text mode with eight colors (ABC 800 C) or 80×24 text mode monochrome (ABC 800 M). They could also be extended with "high" resolution graphics (240×240 pixels at 2 bpp) using 16 KB RAM as video memory.

== Models ==
=== ABC 800 ===
The ABC 800 came in a monochrome version with amber text on a brown background with an 80 character wide screen, and a color version with 40 characters. The main board is integrated with the keyboard, much like the Amiga 500. However, the ABC computer has a very sturdy metal chassis.

Storage is usually two 5.25" floppy disk units in 160, 320 or 640 KB capacity. External hard disk systems became available later (primarily the ABC 850 with 10 MB). Model numbers 'ABC 800 M' for monochrome and 'ABC 800 C' for color.

Luxor advertising asked, "Who needs IBM-compatibility?" However, most computer buyers eventually considered it a requirement. A certain degree of compatibility between the ABC and IBM PC platforms could be achieved with the help of a program called 'W ABC'.

The ABC 800 computer was also sold by Facit under the name Facit DTC.

=== ABC 802 ===
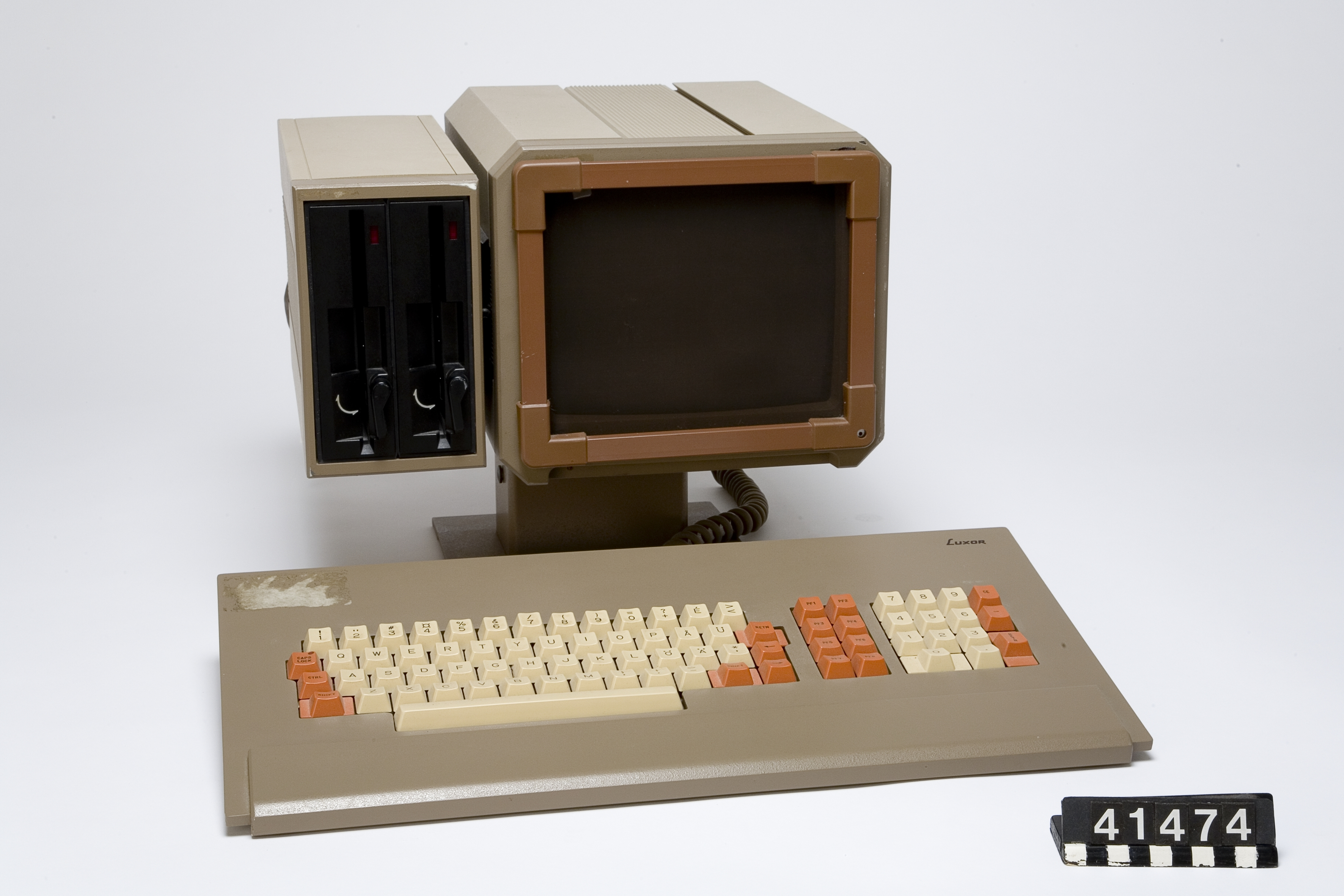
Swedish computer/terminal Luxor ABC 802

The ABC 802 is a compact version with 64 KB RAM where 32 KB is used as a RAM disk. The main board is integrated with a 9" CRT screen and has improved graphics, though no high-resolution graphics. Luxor ABC 802 was a model with a small monochrome screen in yellow phosphor, intended for offices. Here with two 5.25 inch disk drives along the side of the display. The grey-brown color was common for all ABC 800 (and ABC 1600) products and was different from the beige ABC 80.

=== ABC 806 ===
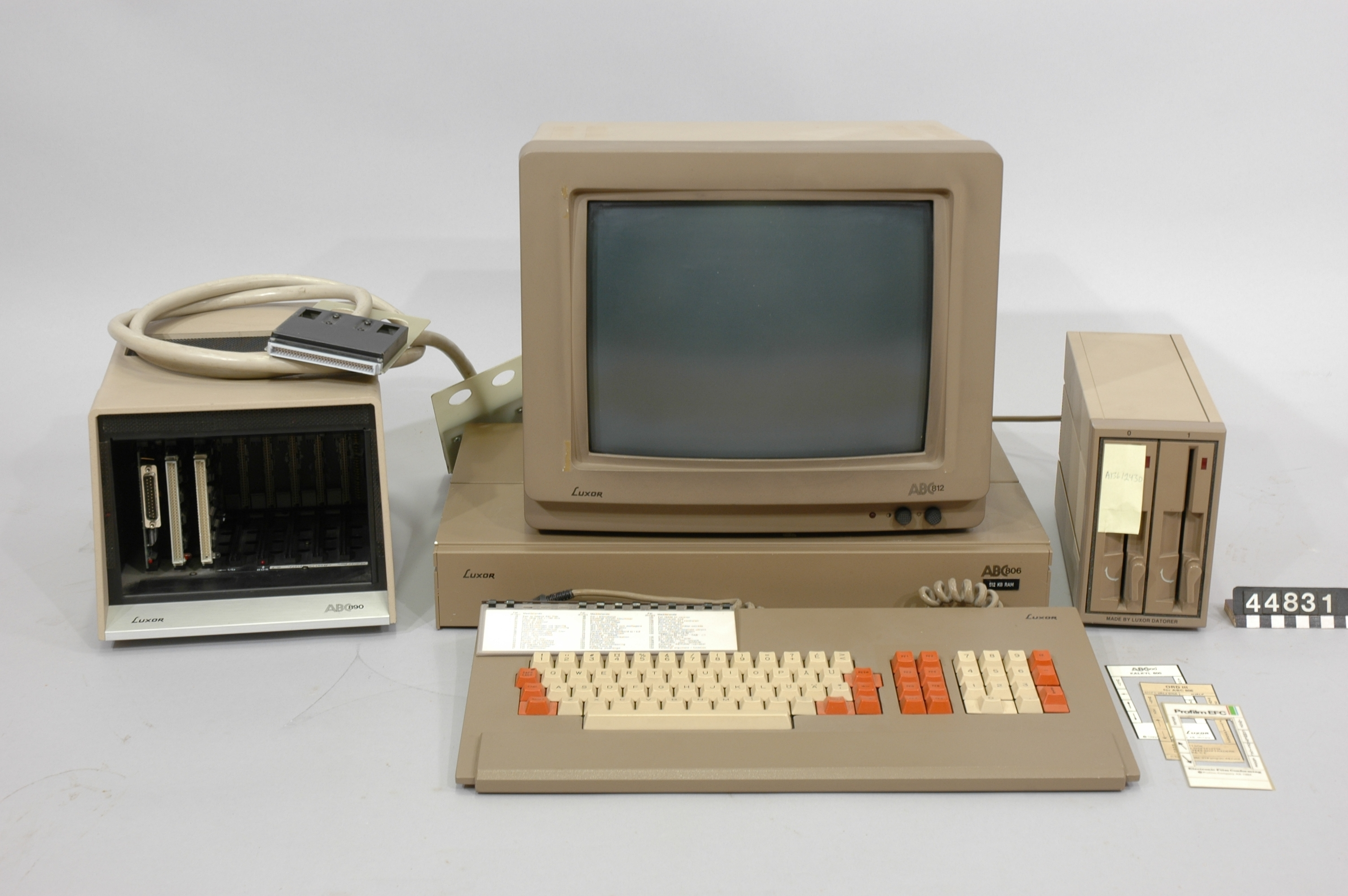
The Luxor ABC 806 model.

The ABC 806 is a version with main board, screen (DA-15) and keyboard (DIN-7) as separate units. It has 164 KB RAM where 128 KB is used as a RAM disk, as well as more advanced 512×240×16 graphics.

== Performance ==
In order to see how the ABC 800 would compare to other contemporary personal computers, in 1982, the Swedish magazine MikroDatorn used the Rugg/Feldman benchmarks of eight short BASIC programs (BM1 - BM8) defined by the American Kilobaud Magazine and routinely used by the British magazine Personal Computer World for testing new machines.

The result was that ABC 800's semi-compiling BASIC interpreter turned out to be faster than most other BASICs used in popular machines, especially when integer variables are used, the results for some well known computers were as follows (times in seconds):

Computer	CPU	[MHz]	BM1	BM2	BM3	BM4	BM5	BM6	BM7	BM8
ABC 800 single precision	Z80	3	0.9	1.8	6.0	5.9	6.3	11.6	19.6	29
ABC 800 double precision	Z80	3	1.2	2.2	10.0	10.6	11.0	17.8	26.4	144
IBM PC	8088	4.77	1.5	5.2	12.1	12.6	13.6	23.5	37.4	35
Apple III	S6502	2	1.7	7.2	13.5	14.5	16.0	27.0	42.5	75
VIC-20	6502	1.108	1.4	8.3	15.5	17.1	18.3	27.2	42.7	99
ZX81 in "fast mode"	Z80	3.25	4.5	6.9	16.4	15.8	18.6	49.7	68.5	229

As seen from the table, the ABC 800 was approximately twice as fast as the IBM PC on floating point calculations, except for BM8 where it was only 20% faster. Using integer variables (only measured for the older ABC 80 in this test) the numbers would be approximately 2-3 times as low (i.e. speeds 2-3 times as high) as for the single precision results in the table.

== ABC 800 character set ==
ABC 800 character set, as described on the user manual

ASCII code	Character Mode	Graphic Mode	ASCII code	Character Mode	Graphic Mode	ASCII code	Character Mode	Graphic Mode	ASCII code	Character Mode	Graphic Mode
32		NBSP	56	8	🬖	80	P	P	104	h	🬦
33	!	🬀	57	9	🬗	81	Q	Q	105	i	🬧
34	"	🬁	58	:	🬘	82	R	R	106	j	▐
35	#	🬂	59	;	🬙	83	S	S	107	k	🬨
36		🬃	60	<	🬚	84	T	T	108	l	🬩
37	%	🬄	61	=	🬛	85	U	U	109	m	🬪
38	&	🬅	62	>	🬜	86	V	V	110	n	🬫
39	´	🬆	63	?	🬝	87	W	W	111	o	🬬
40	(	🬇	64	É	É	88	X	X	112	p	🬭
41	)	🬈	65	A	A	89	Y	Y	113	q	🬮
42	*	🬉	66	B	B	90	Z	Z	114	r	🬯
43	+	🬊	67	C	C	91	Ä	Ä	115	s	🬰
44	,	🬋	68	D	D	92	Ö	Ö	116	t	🬱
45	-	🬌	69	E	E	93	Å	Å	117	u	🬲
46	.	🬍	70	F	F	94	Ü	Ü	118	v	🬳
47	/	🬎	71	G	G	95	-	-	119	w	🬴
48	0	🬏	72	H	H	96	é	🬞	120	x	🬵
49	1	🬐	73	I	I	97	a	🬟	121	y	🬶
50	2	🬑	74	J	J	98	b	🬠	122	z	🬷
51	3	🬒	75	L	L	99	c	🬡	123	ä	🬸
52	4	🬓	76	N	N	100	d	🬢	124	ö	🬹
53	5	▌	77	M	M	101	e	🬣	125	å	🬺
54	6	🬔	78	N	N	102	f	🬤	126	ü	🬻
55	7	🬕	79	O	O	103	g	🬥	127	🬹	█

== See also ==
- ABC 80
- ABC 1600 - Unix-based
