= MikroDatorn =

Swedish computer magazine

MikroDatorn was a Swedish computer magazine. The first issue of MikroDatorn was published in 1978, which makes it one of the oldest computer magazines in Sweden (Datornytt, published by Nordpress and disestablished in 1991, was older). MikroDatorn was published on a monthly basis.

MikroDatorn focused on reviews of computer products. In 2011 the magazine merged with PC för Alla to form PC för Alla Extreme!.
