= National Museum of Science and Technology (Sweden) =

Swedish museum

Coordinates: 59°19′57″N 18°07′07″E

Tekniska museet Swedish National Museum of Science and Technology

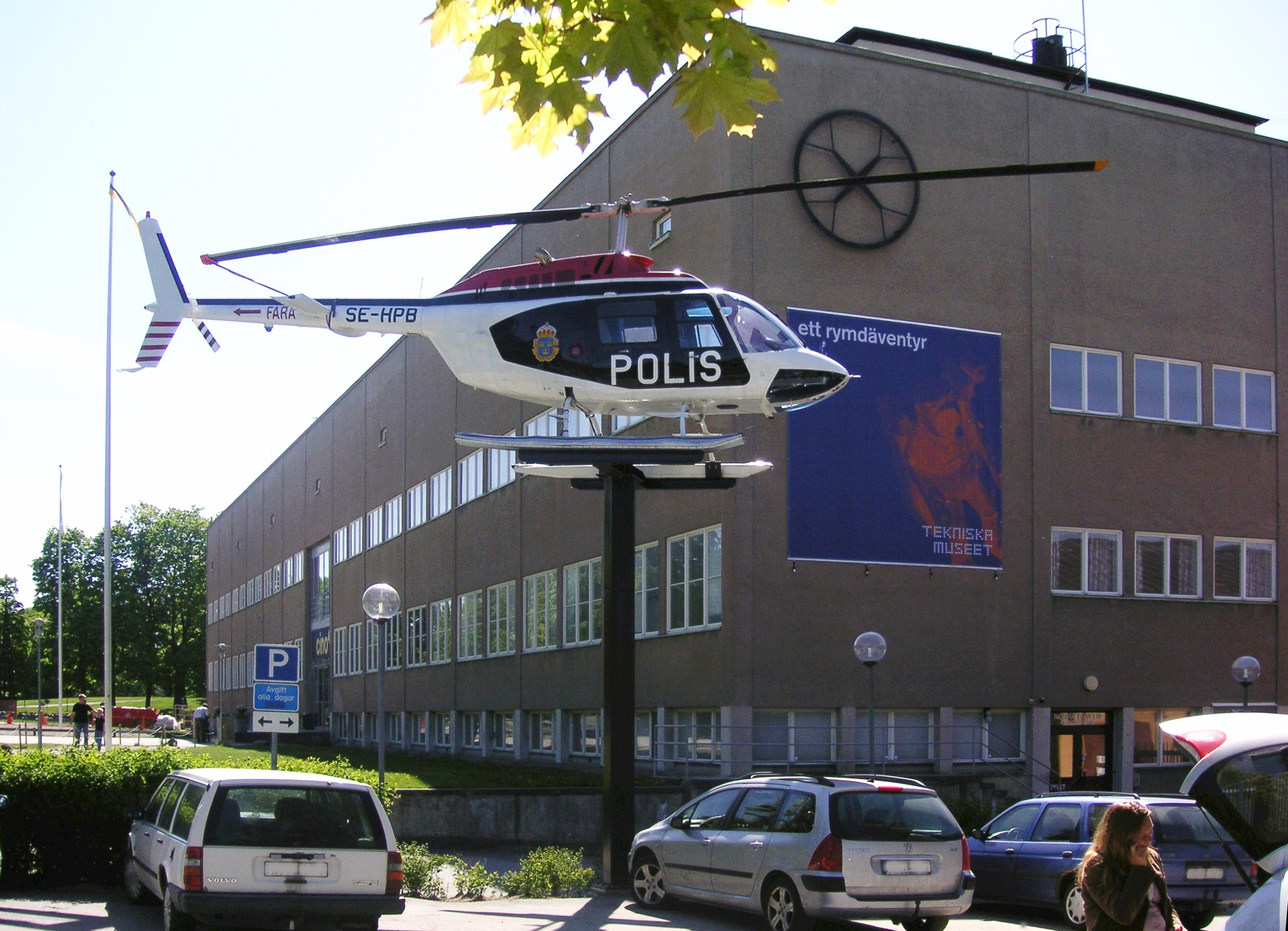
- The National Museum of Technology (main entrance)
- Established: 1923
- Location: Tekniska museet, Djurgården, Stockholm, Sweden
- Type: Technology museum
- Visitors: 301,937 (2022)
- Director: Peter Skogh
- Public transit access: Bus No. 69 to Museiparken
- Website: www.tekniskamuseet.se

The National Museum of Science and Technology (Swedish: Tekniska museet) is a museum in Stockholm. It is Sweden's largest museum of technology, and has a national charter to be responsible for preserving the Swedish cultural heritage related to technological and industrial history. Its galleries comprise around 10,000 square meters, and the museum attracts annually about 350,000 visitors. The collections consist of more than 55,000 objects and artifacts, 1 200 shelf metres of archival records and documents, 200,000 drawings, 800,000 images and about 40,000 books. The National Museum of Science and Technology also documents technologies, processes, stories and memoirs in order to preserve them for generations to come.

== History ==
The National Museum of Science and Technology was founded in 1924 by the Royal Swedish Academy of Engineering Sciences, the Confederation of Swedish Enterprise (formerly the Federation of Swedish Industries), the Swedish Inventors' Association and the Swedish Association of Graduate Engineers (formerly Svenska Teknologföreningen – roughly, the Swedish Association of Technologists). Its present building is designed in the functionalistic style by architect Ragnar Hjorth, and was opened in 1936. The museum became a foundation in 1947; and has been operated with government funding since 1964.

In 2016, the museum received the Museum of the Year Award, which is awarded by the Swedish branch of International Council of Museums and by the Swedish Riksförbundet Sveriges museer (National Association of Museums.) The jury cited the museum's focus on inclusivity, calling it "the favorite place of all small geniuses."

In 2017, the Museum received the Children in Museums Award from the International Association of Children in Museums. The jury particularly cited the exhibition Megamind, for "its high quality design, total accessibility and basis of serious research and development of contents [that] reaches a new level in children’s museums."

== Gallery ==
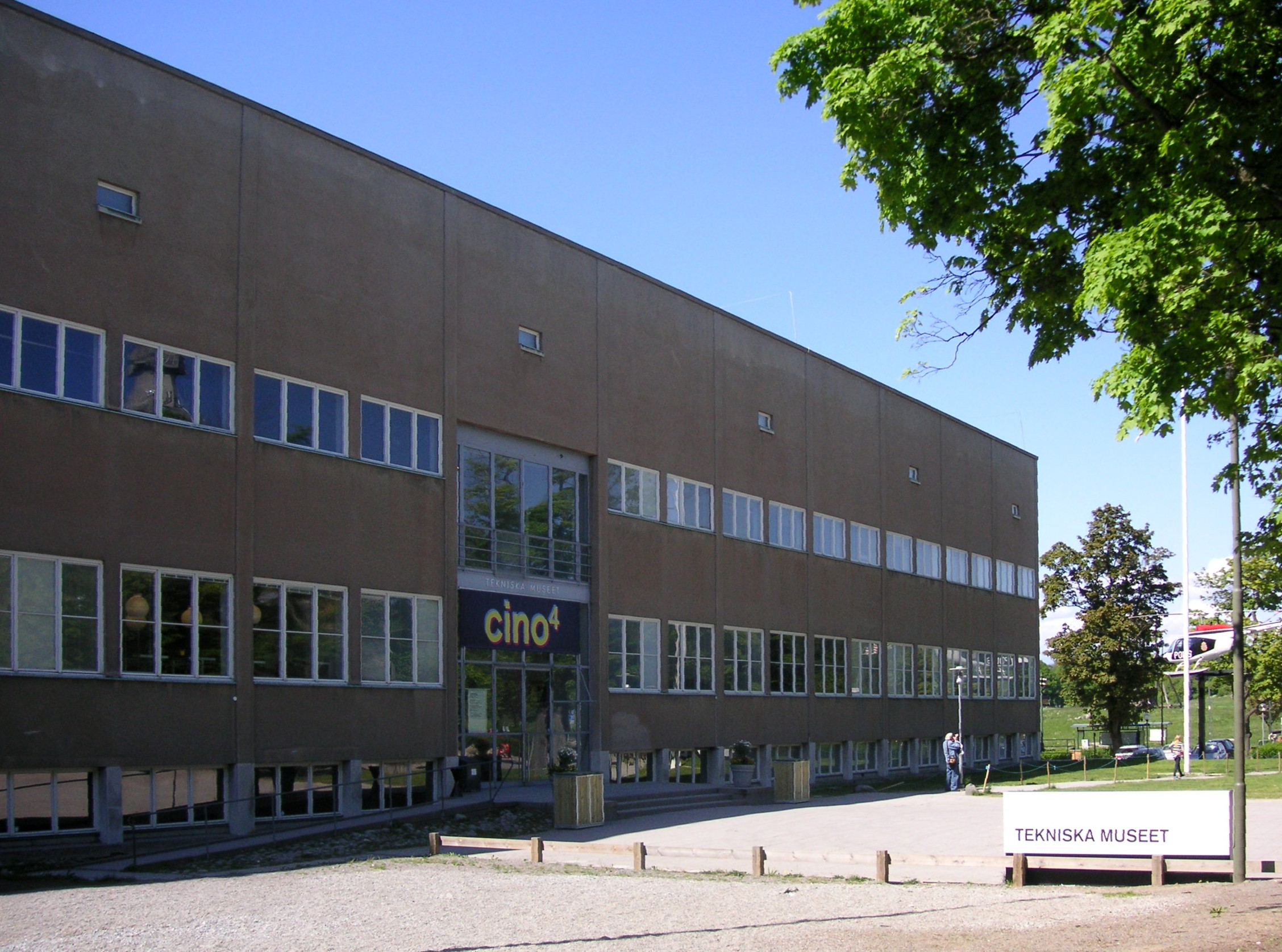
The National Museum of Science and Technology.

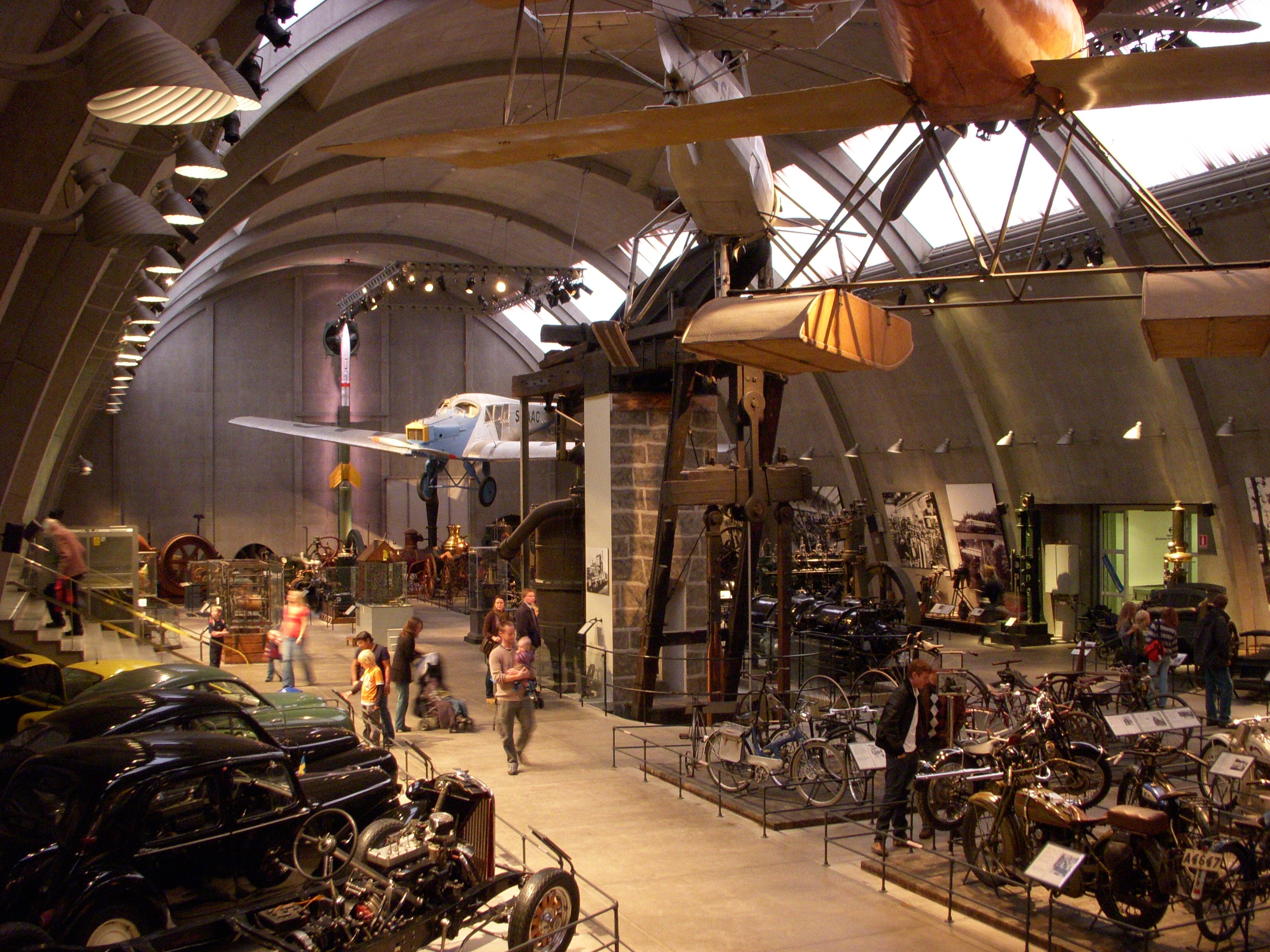
The Machine Hall

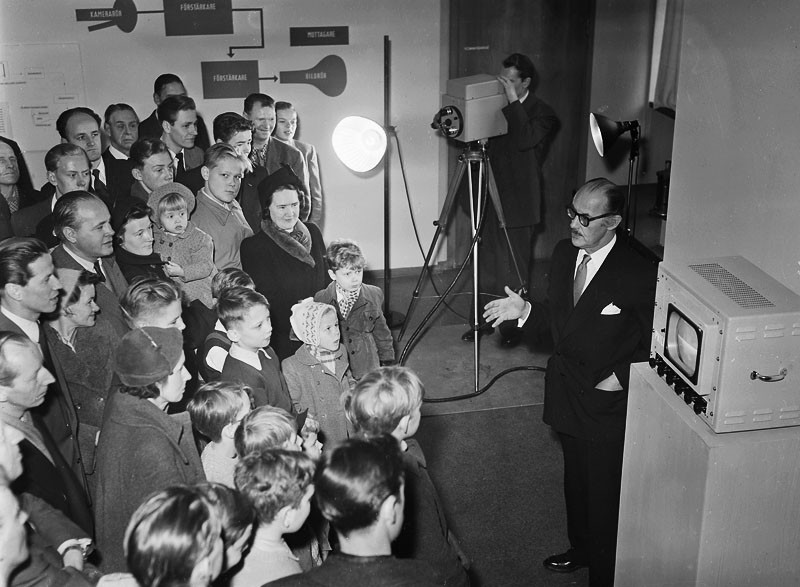
Philips demonstration of television, November 1952.

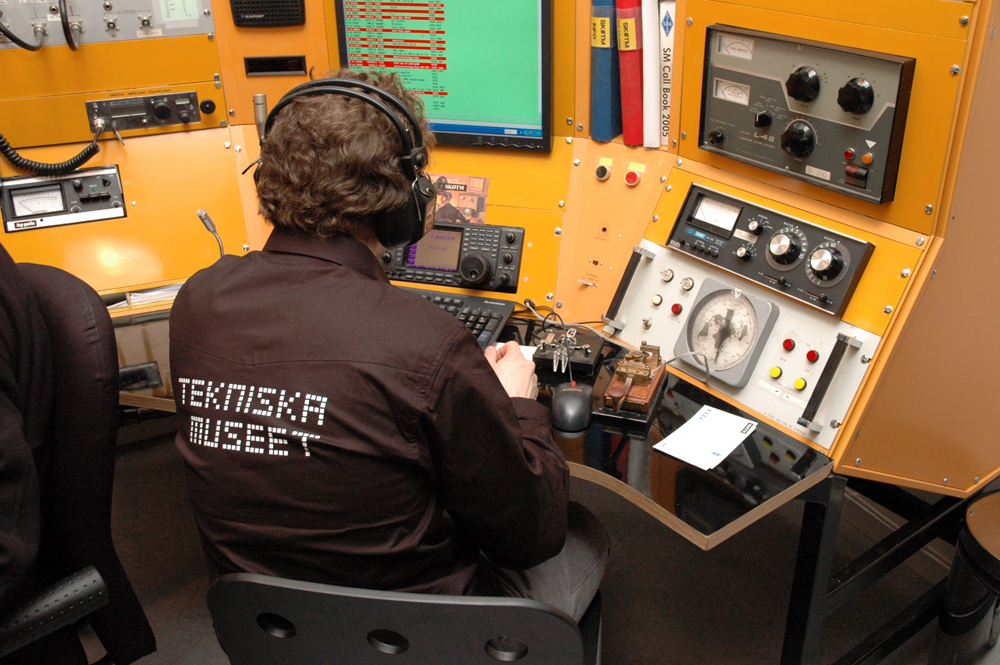
Museum's amateur radio station.

== See also ==
- List of museums in Stockholm
