= Luxor AB =

Swedish home electronics and computer manufacturer

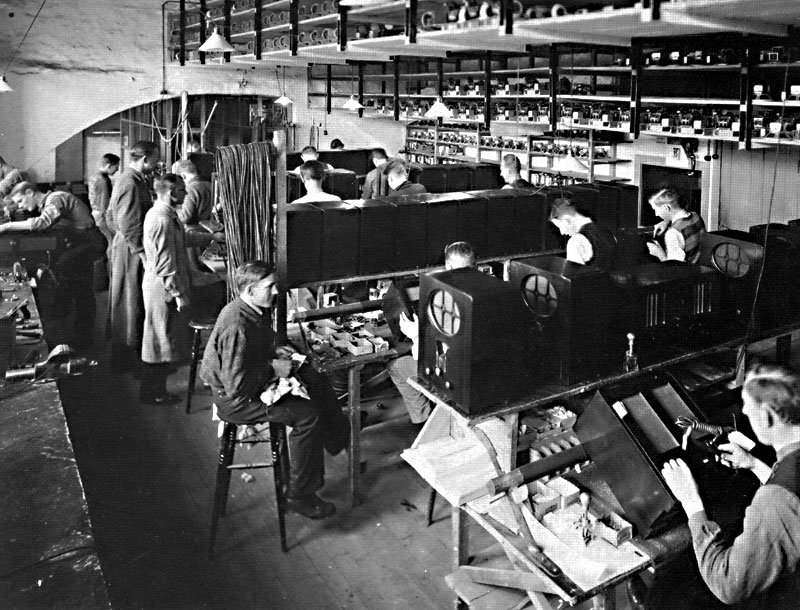
Interior of Luxor Radio Factory in Motala, Sweden, 1934

Luxor was a Swedish home electronics and computer manufacturer located in Motala, established in 1923 and acquired by Nokia in 1985. The brand name is now owned by Turkish company Vestel and is used for televisions sold in the Swedish market.

Originally a manufacturer of tape recorders, radios, television sets, stereo systems, and other home electronics, it launched its first home computer, the ABC 80 in 1978. The succeeding ABC 800 series was introduced in 1981 with new releases in 1983 being produced until the ABC line was terminated in 1986.

== History ==
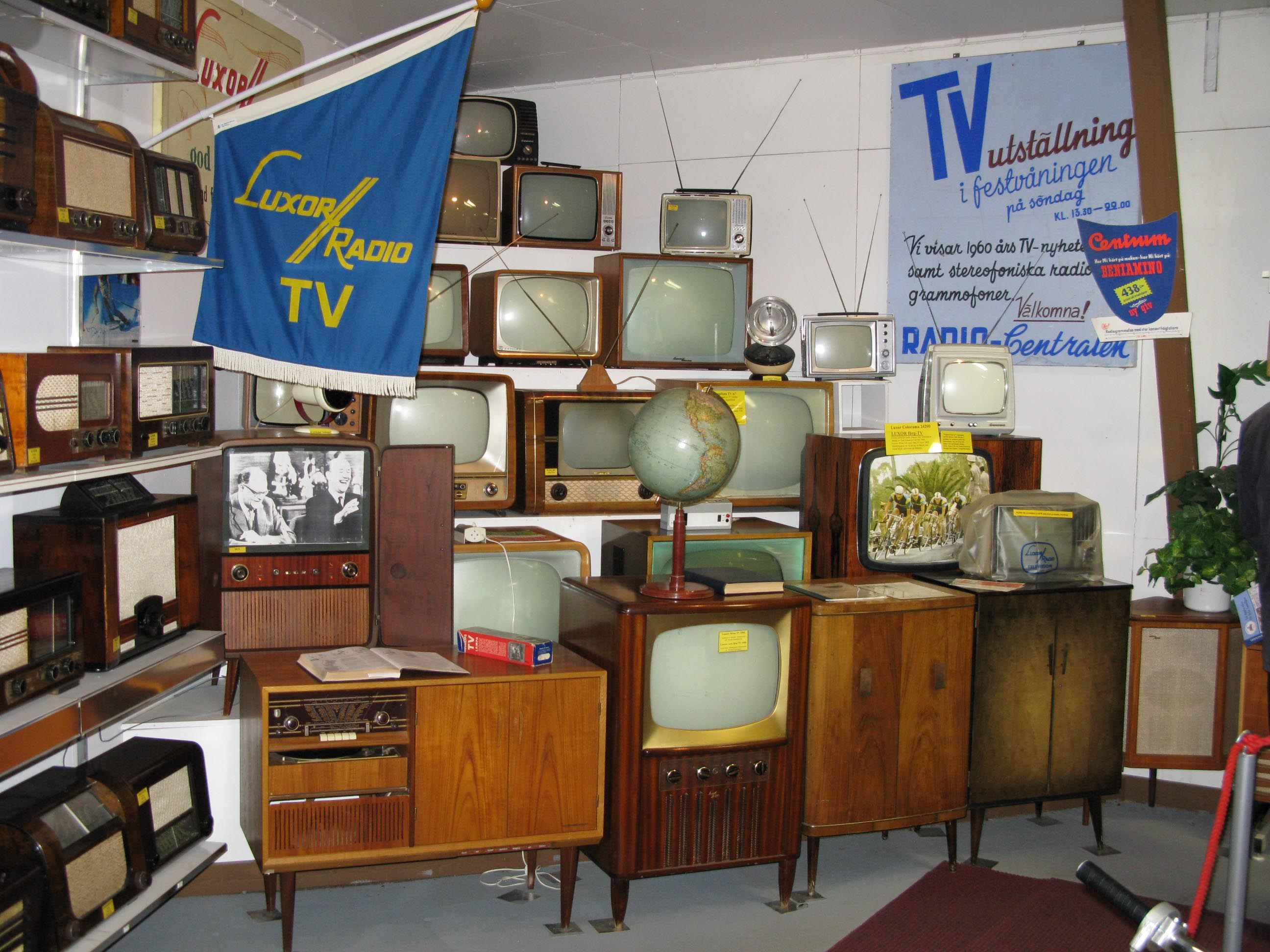
Luxor radio and TV sets

The company was established in 1923 by Axel Holstensson (full name Axel Harald Holstensson; 1889–1979). He was the son of an ore loader and had no training other than a few years of elementary school. He worked as an electrician and eventually as a travel fitter and foreman at ASEA for years, from 1907 to 1918. In his spare time, he studied electrical engineering. In 1918, he moved to Motala and started an electronics store and installation company Motala Electric Agency (Swedish: Motala Elektriska Byrå). The post-war depression, however, almost led to bankruptcy, the situation was critical and the resort was to start building radios. Components were procured from Germany and it was shown to be possible to sell a number of devices at a profit, so Axel Holstensson registered the Luxor Radio Factory Company (Swedish: Firma Radiofabriken Luxor) in 1923. The name Luxor was apposite and then very topical as the Tomb of Tutankhamun had just been discovered near the city of Luxor in Egypt.

Finnish company Nokia became a principal owner in the company in 1984. Computer production was discontinued in 1986, followed by television production in Motala in 1992, when the production moved to Finland. Instead, it produced receivers for cable and satellite television. But Nokia wanted to streamline its business to mobile telephony and therefore sold the satellite receiver business in 1998 to American company Space Craft Inc. The company continued to manufacture satellite receivers in Motala until 2002, when it was transferred to low-cost countries.

In October 1997, Nokia sold its car speaker and audio amplifier business to Harman International Industries. A collaboration with the then Electrolux-owned Autoliv AB led to the company first becoming a partner for Luxor Electronics since 1998, then buying the entire business. In Motala, there still remains manufacturing of various types of electronic products for the automotive industry but not under the Luxor brand.

The brand name was later sold to the Norwegian retailer Elkjøp ASA, as when British company Dixons Retail bought Elkjøp in November 1999, they also acquired the Luxor brand. In 2006 Turkish company Vestel acquired the Luxor brand.

== See also ==
- List of Swedish companies
