= HP CloudSystem =

HP CloudSystem is a cloud infrastructure from Hewlett Packard Enterprise (HPE) that combines storage, servers, networking and software.

HP CloudSystem is now branded HP Helion CloudSystem and is an integral component of the HPE Helion portfolio.

== History ==
HP CloudSystem was first launched in January 2011. Many of its components are based on earlier HP products. HP CloudSystem is based on HP BladeSystem Matrix technology, which was originally launched in 2009. BladeSystem Matrix is a combination of HP Systems Insight Manager, HP BladeSystem c-Class blade chassis and HP StorageWorks EVA Fibre Channel Storage framework, along with Microsoft Active Directory and virtualization Hypervisors from Microsoft and VMware. HP Insight Orchestration provides the orchestration functionality.

Previous versions of HP CloudSystem combined HP Matrix Operating Environment, which manages, monitors and provisions servers for physical and virtual resources and HP Cloud Service Automation Software, a set of system management tools used to provide and manage the lifecycle of IT services. BladeSystem Matrix supports HP ProLiant x64 blades running Microsoft Windows and Linux, and HP Integrity blades running HP-UX.

HP CloudSystem is now branded HP Helion CloudSystem and is an integral component of the HP Helion portfolio.

== Cloud migration challenges ==
The migration of traditional IT, in which IT directly controls IT purchasing, deployment, management, and use, to a cloud computing model holds a number of challenges. A paper titled "Cloud Migration: A Case Study of Migrating an Enterprise IT System to IaaS," by researchers at the Cloud Computing Co-laboratory, School of Computer Science, University of St Andrews, raises several socio-technical issues related to the migration of IT services to the cloud. The researchers state that in-house IT personnel are at risk of becoming dependent upon the cloud service vendor, of which the user organization has no control over. The researchers also note that the user organization could also require more resources to carry out migration to the cloud and overcome the issues that could crop up after migration, such as a lack of in-house knowledge of cloud operations.

The researchers also note that the user organization's customer representatives could take longer to resolve customer problems, as their questions may require input from the external cloud services provider. Furthermore, migrating to cloud computing could reduce job satisfaction among IT staffers, whose jobs change from a hands-on technical role to managing external service providers. User organizations must also learn to cope with a new way of managing IT as they are no longer in charge of software support contracts or hardware maintenance issues.

Other cloud migration challenges that have been cited include security, vendor management and technical integration. Security experts have raised the issue that because public clouds are multi-tenant (see: Multitenancy), meaning that the cloud provider hosts data from many different user organizations, opening up security risks. Vulnerabilities or defects in one organization's applications could negatively affect other applications hosted by the same service provider.

Under the vendor management issue, user organizations must also take responsibility of ensuring different cloud providers meet their Service-level agreements. User organizations must identify what is required to integrate the cloud service with their existing IT infrastructure. The user organization may need to create a virtual machine template that describes the infrastructure, application and the security that's required of the service provider.

Dan Kusnetzky, cloud computing analyst at research firm the 451 group cites resistance to change as an inhibitor to cloud computing. He is quoted as saying: "Basically, IT people are charged with keeping the status quo, because the possibility for changes introduces the chances that things will stop working." HP's Cloud Discovery Workshop and HP Cloud Roadmap Services has been described as created to address these concerns. The workshops aim to educate user organizations about the impact of cloud computing to company culture. The opportunities and risks of cloud computing are also discussed. The roadmap service is offered as an addition to the discovery workshop. It aims to help organizations plan and adopt cloud computing.

== CloudSystem environments and characteristics ==
=== Cloud Service Automation Software ===
CloudSystem includes HP Cloud Service Automation Software, a set of system management tools used to provide and manage the lifecycle of IT services. That is done in an automated way. Cloud Service Automation Software is based on technology from a company acquired by HP in 2007 called Opsware. The tools that are part of CSA manage the following cloud tasks: workflow, configuration, provisioning, management and monitoring.

Lauren Nelson, an analyst with industry research company Forrester Research has been cited as describing CSA as offering tools to create a cloud that would be similar to Amazon Web Services or Rackspace Cloud from a collection of servers.

=== CloudSystem Matrix ===
Industry analyst company Illuminata has described CloudSystem Matrix as a "coordinated system for setting up pools of modular resources and flexibly deploying IT services across those pools." HP CloudSystem Matrix is a platform for private clouds. It has been described as helping to shorten the time it takes for user organizations to deliver complex applications and IT infrastructures.

HP CloudSystem Matrix 7.0 cloud automation environment was launched in November 2011. It includes pre-integrated server, network, storage and software components. This version also includes cloud bursting capabilities and automated self-provisioning.

Judith Hurwitz, a widely recognized industry analyst described CloudSystem Matrix as a linchpin of HP's cloud strategy. She has described CloudSystem Matrix as a unified computing system that combines virtual and physical server blades. A central console is used to manage resource pools, physical and virtual servers and network connectivity. Among the virtualization hypervisors supported are VMware, KVM and Microsoft Hyper-V, Hurwitz writes in her article.

The engine of CloudSystem Matrix is the Matrix Operating Environment, which manages, monitors and provisions servers for physical and virtual resources. Matrix OE also carries out network management. It is an infrastructure lifecycle management software that enables users to provision and modify complex infrastructures according to dynamic business demands. CloudSystem Matrix includes HP Cloud Maps, a set of templates to assist user organizations to architect cloud computing infrastructures to deliver applications and services. HP Cloud Maps templates are pre-configured to include workflow and deployment scripts for cloud services. Cloud Maps have also been described as pre-configured templates for creating application stacks. These stacks could include workflows or third-party applications from Microsoft, SAP and Oracle to be delivered as cloud services. The templates can be loaded into CloudSystem to create a cloud services catalog. HP has been cited as describing Cloud Maps as reducing the time it takes to provision cloud services by 80%, and to reduce the time it takes for compliance management by up to 75%.

=== HP CloudStart ===
HP CloudStart enables user organizations to design, build and install a private cloud based on CloudSystem Matrix. CloudStart includes Cloud Service Automation and a virtual infrastructure provisioning product that features a self-service portal. It also provides resource metering and chargeback facilities for private clouds. IT services are also included with CloudStart, including an assessment of the user organization's existing IT infrastructure plus recommendations for how the organization could use cloud computing. The cloud configuration is set up by HP, which also moves the defined services to the cloud. Training is also provided to the user organization. HP has been cited as saying that it can create a private cloud for user organizations within 30 days of its initial engagement with the organization.

=== Cloud orchestration ===
Cloud computing disperses applications and services among multiple servers and, in some cases, multiple data centers. Cloud orchestration coordinates the different cloud elements to ensure systems and applications management, integration, support, billing, provisioning, service-level agreement management and contract management. Cloud orchestration is a part of CloudSystem and the feature is based on Opsware Workflow, a centralized console for provisioning and server and patch management.

=== CloudSystem Enterprise ===
CloudSystem Enterprise provides a single environment for the creation and management of private clouds. Based on Cloud Service Automation, CloudSystem Enterprise manages private clouds running on standalone physical servers, and hybrid clouds running across private and public clouds. CloudSystem Enterprise includes a lifecycle management tool to manage the deployment and retirement of applications and infrastructure.

=== HP CloudSystem Service Provider ===
CloudSystem Service Provider is a platform for service providers to deliver public and virtual hosted private cloud services. It is aimed at service providers building Private clouds or Public clouds for Infrastructure as a service, Platform as a service, or software-as-a-service. CloudSystem can be used by service providers to provide cloud services on carrier-level networks and IT infrastructures. It also allow service providers to automate and provision cloud services.

=== Cloud bursting ===
In November 2011, HP announced a cloud bursting feature for CloudSystem. This feature enables CloudSystem to use the capacity of external private and public clouds when demand increases.

CloudSystem includes other software. This includes HP TippingPoint, which provides intrusion detection, network security and traffic management. CloudSystem is based on templates called CloudMaps that provide common enterprise application stacks. Compliance is provided by HP ArcSight.

=== Third-party support ===
CloudSystem is supported by a partner program, which helps cloud computing services vendors to build Cloud Centers of Excellence. These have been described as demonstration clouds for HP CloudSystem and HP Converged Systems platforms. The centers can include products from HP Networking, HP TippingPoint and HP 3PAR storage.

Certified HP partners are also able to offer HP workshops, such as the HP Cloud Discovery Workshops and other training support. The Cloud Discovery Workshop is designed to educate attendees about cloud computing and helps attendees establish how cloud computing fits into their organizations and discusses best practices.
