= Stratavia =

Stratavia Corp.
- Type: Now owned by Hewlett-Packard Company
- Industry: Software
- Founded: 2001
- Headquarters: Denver
- Key people: Thor Culverhouse, CEO; Venkat Devraj, CTO; Rainier Luistro, Co-CTO; Jennifer Panning, CFO; Mike Puterbaugh, VP, Marketing
- Products: HP Database and Middleware Automation software (formerly called Data Palette Data Center Automation Platform)
- Website: HP Software website

Stratavia, formerly known as ExtraQuest, was a software company that specialized in enterprise Database and Data Center Automation, and private cloud computing enablement. Stratavia was founded by Venkat Devraj and Rainier Luistro in 2001.

The company held two patents for automating standard operating procedures in database administration, and was included in the analyst firm Gartner's list of Cool Vendors for 2009.

The company received venture funding from Vista Ventures, Asset Management Company and Adams Street Partners and is headquartered in Denver, Colorado, with offices in San Francisco, New York City, Atlanta, Boston and London, United Kingdom. In Aug. 2010, HP announced the acquisition of Stratavia to bolster its cloud computing and automation software portfolio.

HP Software Division planned to integrate Stratavia technology into its cloud computing portfolio, including HP Cloud Service Automation Software.
