= LOM port =

Out-of-band management platform by Sun Microsystems

The LOM port (Lights Out Management port) is a remote access facility on a Sun Microsystems server. When the main processor is switched off, or when it is impossible to telnet to the server, an operator would use a link to the LOM port to access the server. As long as the server has power, the LOM facility will work, regardless of whether or not the main processor is switched on.

To use the LOM port, a rollover cable or nullmodem serial DB9 cable on some models is connected to the LOM port, which is located at the back of the Sun server. The other end of the cable is connected to a terminal or a PC running a terminal emulator. The terminal or emulator must be set to a transmission rate of 9600 bits per second, and hardware flow control enabled.

== Implementations ==
Specific implementations include:

- Advanced Lights Out Management (ALOM), Sun Microsystems-specific and comes standard on newer Sun servers (SunFire V125/V210/V215/V240/V245/V250/V440/T1000/T2000, Sun Netra 210/240/440).
- Integrated Lights Out Management (ILOM), Sun Microsystems's ALOM replacement on Sun x64 server SunFire X4100(M2)/X4200(M2)/X4600(M2)/X4140/X4240/X4440/X4150/X4250/X4450/X4170/X4270/X2250/X2270, Sun Blade 6000 Chassis Management Module/Blade Module(X6220/X6420/X6240/X6440/X6250/X6450/X6270/X6275), Sun CMT servers/blades (Sun T5120, T5220, T5240, T6340, T6320). Not to be confused with the similar-sounding HP Integrated Lights-Out management technology.
- Lomlite and Lomlite2 Single-chip implementations on the Netra T1 and possibly others. In the cases of the T1-200 and X1, the OpenBoot firmware implements lom@ and lom! commands allowing access to the registers representing temperature, voltage, etc.

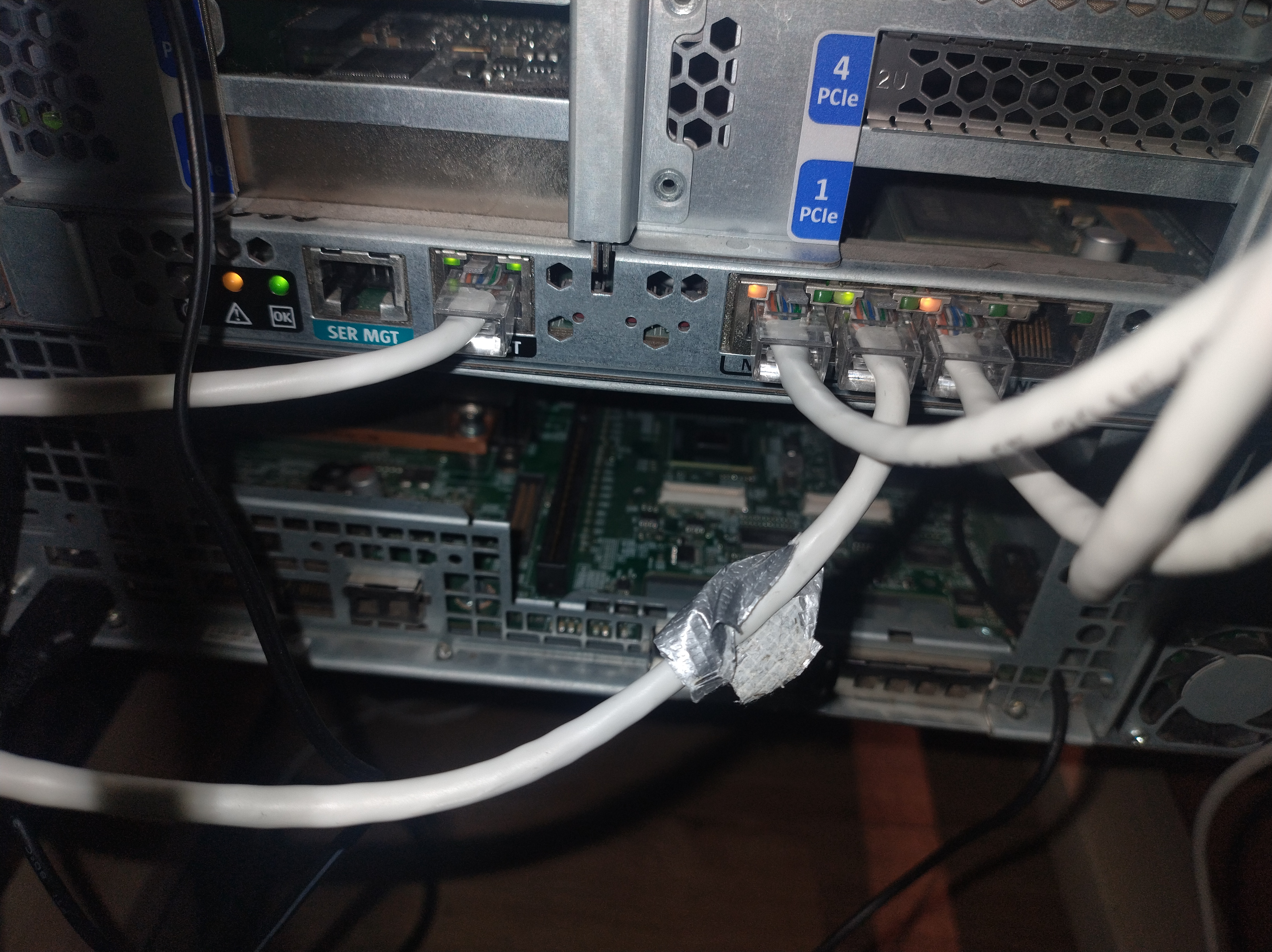
Back of the Sunfire X4270 Server, ILOM serial and network connectors are first 2 RJ45 From the left.

== See also ==
- Out-of-band management
- Power distribution unit
