= IBM RSA =

IBM RSA may refer to:

- IBM Rational Software Architect - modeling and development software environment
- IBM Remote Supervisor Adapter - hardware for x86 servers management
