= ProLiant =

Line of computer servers

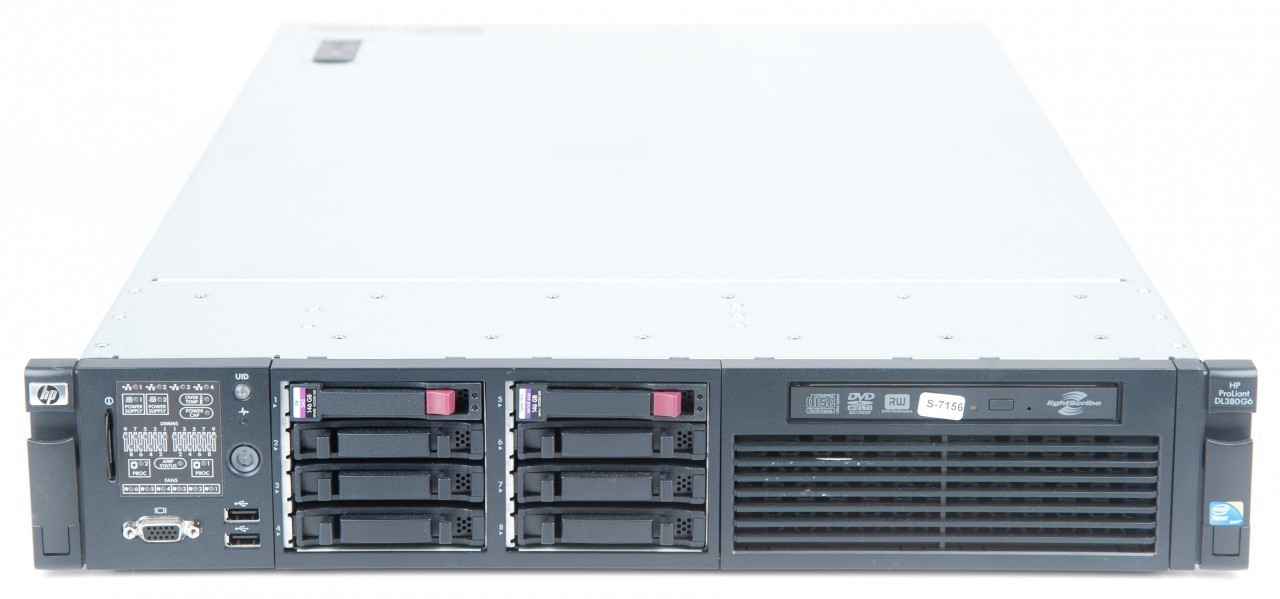
- HP ProLiant DL380 G6
- Developer: Compaq (1993-2002); Hewlett-Packard (2002-2015); Hewlett Packard Enterprise (2015-present)
- Type: Servers
- Released: 1993 (Compaq ProLiant); 2003 (HP ProLiant); 2015 (HPE ProLiant)
- CPU: AMD, Intel, Ampere
- Power: Up to 2.2 kW dual hot-plug 4+0 PSUs
- Marketing target: Business
- Predecessor: 1993 (Compaq): Compaq SystemPro XL (high-end); 2002 (HP acquisition): HP NetServer
- Related: Integrity, BladeSystem
- Website: Compaq ProLiant Servers at the Wayback Machine (archived 2002-04-07); HPE ProLiant Servers

ProLiant is a brand of server computers that was originally introduced by Compaq, and became Hewlett-Packard's (HP) family of servers following the 2002 merger. They are now marketed by Hewlett Packard Enterprise (HPE). ProLiant servers were first introduced by Compaq in 1993, succeeding their SystemPro line of servers in the high-end space.

After Compaq merged with HP in 2002, HP retired its NetServer brand in favor of the ProLiant brand. HP ProLiant systems led the x86 server market in terms of units and revenue during first quarter of 2010. HPE now owns the ProLiant brand after HP split up into two separate companies in 2015.

The HP/HPE ProLiant servers offer many advanced server features such as redundant power supplies, Out-of-band management with iLO or Lights-out 100, Hot-swap components and up to 8-Socket systems.

== History ==
Wordmark logo for ProLiant when it was still being produced by Compaq

The ProLiant series of server computers was originally introduced in 1993 by Compaq to replace their former SystemPro line of servers in the high-end space, with the mid-range space of the SystemPro being succeeded by the ProSignia line of servers and business PCs. The ProLiant and ProSignia brand of servers coexisted with each other until the latter was discontinued in 2000.

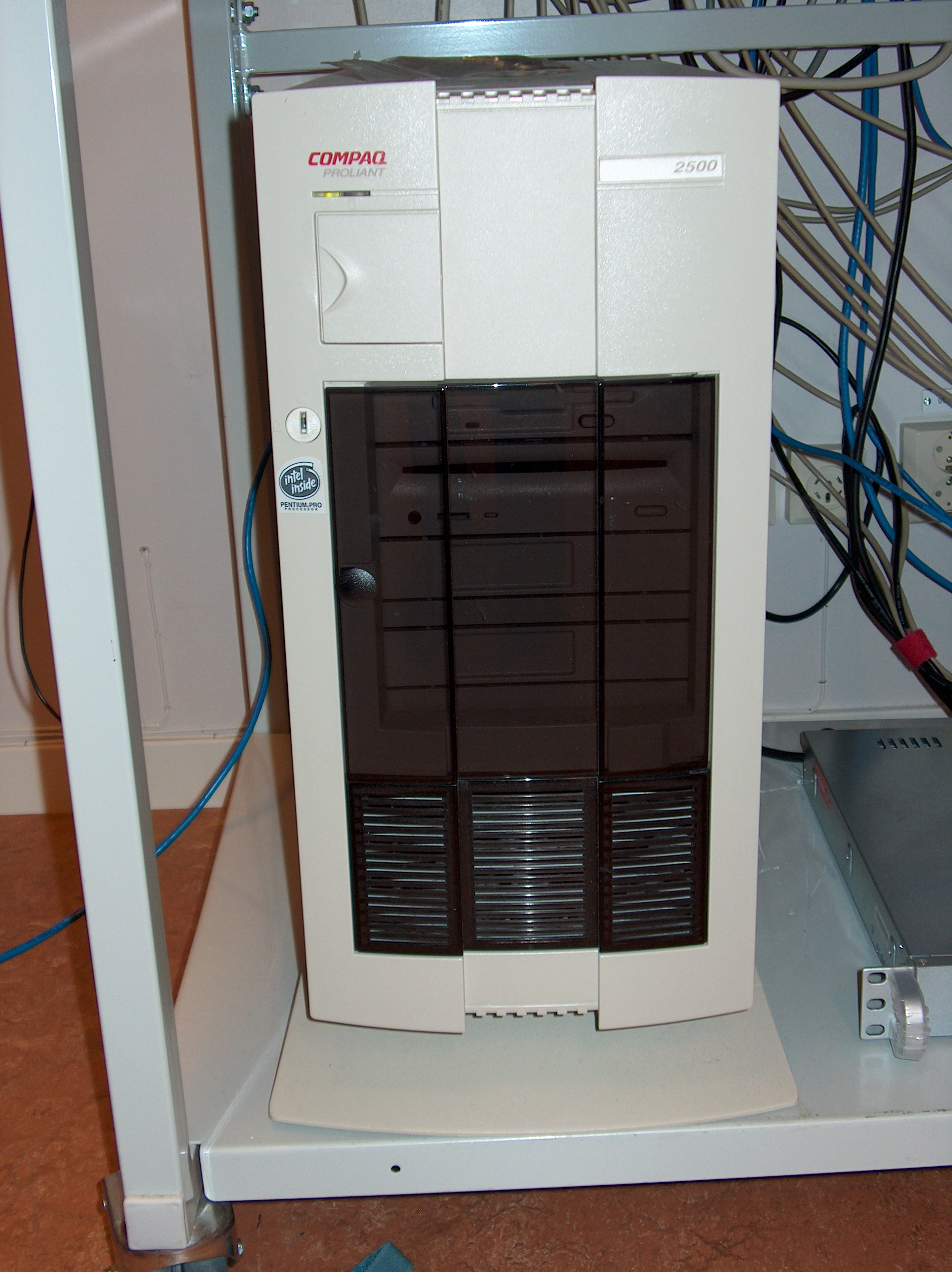
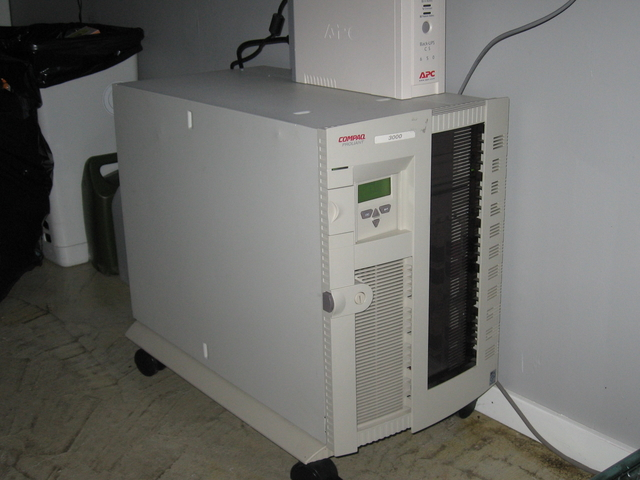
The departmental-oriented Compaq ProLiant 2500 (left) and Compaq ProLiant 3000 (right) servers

From its launch in 1993 up until the early 2000s, numbered models in the ProLiant line were produced, which includes models such as the entry-level 400 series, the workgroup-oriented 800 and 1000 series, the departmental-oriented 2000 and 3000 series, and the enterprise-oriented 4000, 5000, 6000, 7000 and 8000 series.

On November 15, 1999, the ProLiant CL1850 was released as a cluster designed for affordability and space-efficiency to businesses and enterprises of all sizes, using a cube-shaped cabinet which can be either tower or rack mounted.

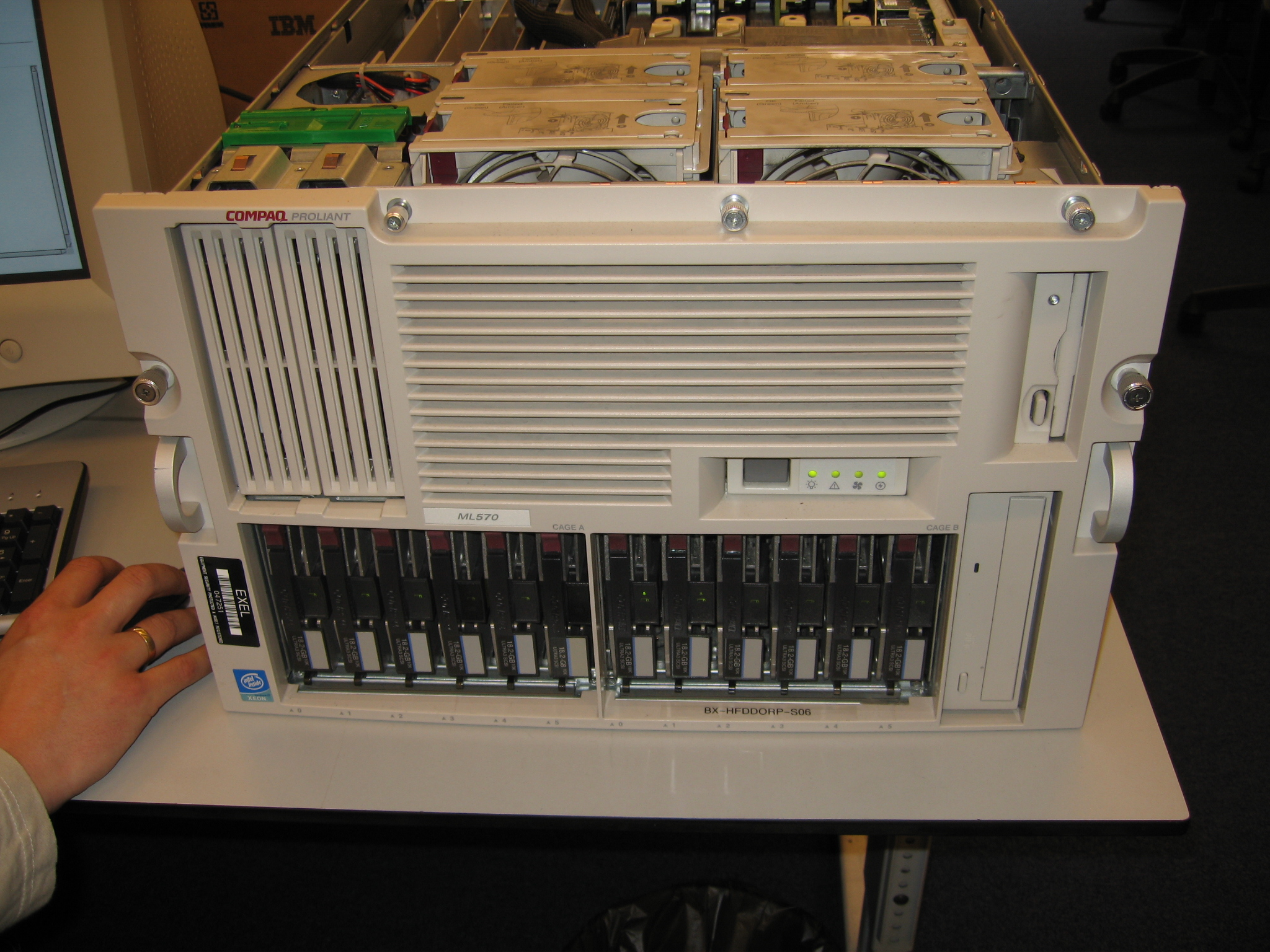
Compaq ProLiant ML570

On January 31, 2000, Compaq introduced the ProLiant ML and DL line of servers as part of a new positioning framework for the ProLiant line, offering two separate and distinct lines to suit different needs in the server market. The ML (Modular Line) line of servers features a modular design that is designed for maximum system expansion, while the DL (Density Line) line of servers consists of powerful, density-optimized servers designed for rack mounted use. This generation of ProLiant servers is referred to as "Gen1" after the introduction of "Gen2" ProLiant servers on October 25, 2000.

The first models produced under the new product lineup were the ProLiant ML350, ML370 and ML530 for the ML line and the ProLiant DL380 for the DL line. The ProLiant ML350 and ProLiant DL380 are the only models of the initial lineup to be continuously produced since its inception, spanning over 12 generations in its 24-year lifespan as of 2024.

The ProLiant CL380 was released on June 5, 2000, joining with the ProLiant CL1850 as part of the CL (Cluster Line) line of servers.

Gen2 ProLiant models featured new and improved hardware over Gen1 ProLiant models as well as an updated enclosure that was previously previewed with the release of the ProLiant ML330 on April 26, 2000.

In May 2002, Compaq was acquired by HP. As part of the merger with Compaq that year, HP discontinued their NetServer line of servers that had been produced the same year ProLiant servers debuted in the early 1990s in favor of Compaq's ProLiant line of servers. The 2002 merger also brought in other products that were formerly made or offered by Compaq at that time, such as the NonStop line of servers (which were formerly owned by Tandem Computers, inc. and then brought out by Compaq in 1997), the Presario line of personal computers, and the iPAQ line of personal digital assistant (PDA) devices, among others.

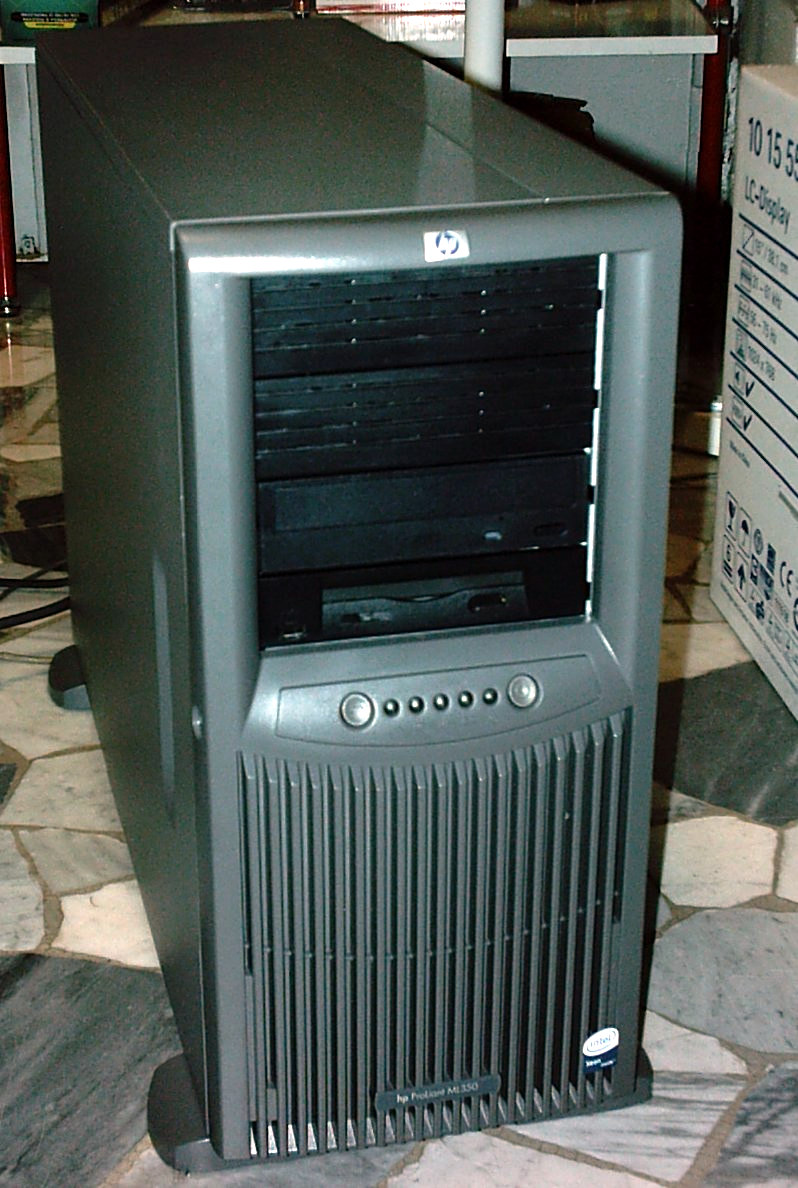
HP ProLiant ML350 G4

Following the 2002 merger, "Gen2" ProLiant servers became produced by HP and Compaq-provided software and tools were slowly replaced by HP-provided ones. Between the early-2000s and early-2010s, various ProLiant server models in Gen3, Gen4, Gen5, Gen6, and Gen7 guises were produced.

In February 2012, HP announced the ProLiant Gen8. Gen8 servers introduced the iLO 4 management processor and the "iLO Management Engine", which bundled Agentless Management, the Active Health System (a continuous log of hardware events and configuration changes) and Intelligent Provisioning, an embedded server deployment tool that replaced SmartStart. The generation also extended the "Sea of Sensors" thermal monitoring feature, first used in seventh-generation servers, into "Sea of Sensors 3D", adding 28 thermal sensors throughout the server and its HP-supplied expansion cards to control fan speeds more precisely. The ProLiant DL580 Gen8 has been described as a "middle generation" between Gen8 and Gen9. It has some of new features introduced in Gen9, primarily the availability of a UEFI boot option.

In April 2013, HP announced a new blade server-based ProLiant, the HP Moonshot Server. The system paired the 4.3U Moonshot 1500 enclosure with up to 45 ProLiant Moonshot server cartridges, the first of which used Intel Atom S1200 processors.

Starting August 28, 2014, HP ProLiant Gen9 series were available based on Intel Haswell chipset and DDR4 memory. The first were the HP ProLiant ML350 Gen9 Server and HP ProLiant BL460c Gen9 Blade. Servers in this generation support both BIOS and UEFI. HP claimed the Gen9 portfolio could triple compute capacity compared with the ProLiant DL380 G6 and improve the performance of business-critical workloads by up to four times, crediting features such as HP DDR4 SmartMemory, HP PCIe accelerators and SmartCache. The embedded management gained UEFI and a RESTful API, and HP said that combining the servers with HP OneView could make infrastructure provisioning up to 66 times faster. The servers became available through HP and its channel partners on September 8, 2014.

On November 1, 2015, HP split up into two separate companies, HP Inc., and HPE. As part of the spilt, HPE inherited the ProLiant line of servers from the original HP along with a few other products, such as the NonStop line of servers originally produced by Tandem Computers, Compaq, and the original HP.

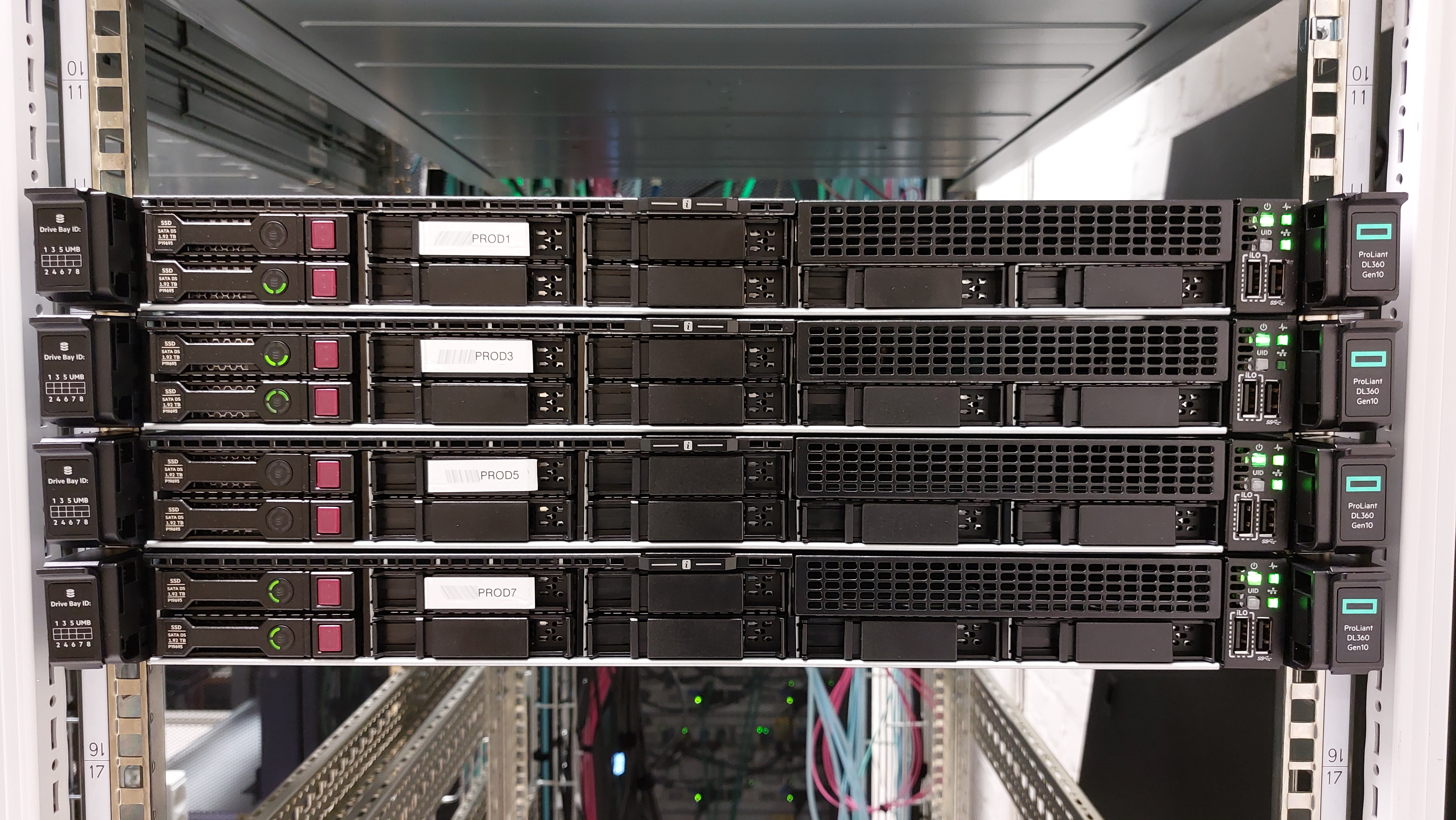
Four HPE ProLiant DL360 Gen10 server nodes in a cluster

HPE announced the Gen10 portfolio on June 5, 2017. Its main new feature was a "silicon root of trust", an immutable fingerprint built into the iLO 5 management chip that prevents a server from booting unless its firmware matches. Starting Q4 2017, HPE ProLiant Gen10 servers were available. Also in November 2017, HPE extended their Gen10 range to include AMD EPYC processors using EPYC's price v cores architectures claiming to lower cost per virtual machine (VM) by 50%. The first such model, the DL385 Gen10, set world records for two-socket servers in the SPECrate2017_fp_base and SPECfp_rate2006 benchmarks when it was announced on November 20, 2017.

The first ProLiant Gen10 Plus servers, the 1U DL325 Gen10 Plus and 2U DL385 Gen10 Plus, were based on second-generation AMD EPYC 7002 processors and added PCIe 4.0 support and 3200 MT/s memory. In April 2021, HPE introduced the ProLiant Gen10 Plus line of servers, which are built on third-generation Intel Xeon scalable processors. Equipped with PCIe Gen4 capabilities, the HPE ProLiant Gen10 Plus servers offer improved data transfer rates and higher networking speeds. The new DL360 and DL380 Gen10 Plus also added support for Intel Software Guard Extensions (SGX). Around the same time, HPE added third-generation AMD EPYC 7003 support through the DL325 Gen10 Plus v2, DL345 Gen10 Plus, DL365 Gen10 Plus and DL385 Gen10 Plus v2.

In November 2022, HPE introduced the ProLiant Gen11 server lineup providing support for several architectures including fourth-generation AMD EPYC processors and fourth-generation Intel Xeon scalable processors. Gen11 servers moved to DDR5 memory, PCIe 5.0 and the iLO 6 management processor. HPE also introduced HPE GreenLake for Compute Ops Management alongside the generation, a subscription-based, cloud-hosted console for monitoring and managing servers. The Ampere-based ProLiant RL300 Gen11 had been announced earlier, in June 2022.

In June 2024, HPE announced the first ProLiant Gen12 servers, the DL384 Gen12 and DL380a Gen12, which featured HPE and Nvidia's next-generation AI technologies and were made available in late 2024. The DL384 Gen12 featured an NVIDIA GH200 NVL2 superchip with 1.2 TB of unified memory to accelerate AI workloads, while the DL380a Gen12 supported up to eight NVIDIA H200 NVL GPUs. On February 12, 2025, HPE announced eight Gen12 servers based on Intel Xeon 6 processors. Six of them, the DL320, DL340, DL360, DL380, DL380a and ML350 Gen12, were available in the first quarter of 2025, with the Synergy 480 and DL580 Gen12 following that summer. The generation introduced iLO 7, which adds a dedicated security processor that HPE calls the "secure enclave".

== Details ==
ProLiant servers produced since 2000 are separated into several different product lines - ML, DL, RL, CL, SL, BL, SY, XL (Apollo), and MicroServer - which generally denote form factor.

ProLiant servers produced by Compaq includes tower-based and rack-mounted servers, which were produced in various different configurations and models since its introduction in 1993. Numbered ProLiant models were produced up until the current ML and DL product lines were introduced in 2000. The ProLiant ML line comprises tower-based servers (convertible to rack mount) with capacity for internal expansion of disks and interconnects, while the DL line comprises general-purpose rack mount servers. Both the ProLiant ML and DL lines were inherited by HP (and HPE) after Compaq was acquired by HP in 2002.

The RL line comprises cloud-native servers that can handle cloud-native workloads, The CL line comprises affordable and space-efficient clusters for business-critical applications, and the SL line comprises rack mounted servers designed for use in data centers and environments where high computing power is required. The BL line comprises blade servers which fit within the HP BladeSystem, the SY line comprises Synergy Blades, and the XL line (also known as Apollo) comprises servers for scale out and High Performance Computing environments. The MicroServer product line addresses home and small businesses.

ProLiant servers are also split into several series which denote processor configuration. The 100, 200, 300 and 400 series comprise single and dual socket capable systems, the 500 and 600 series comprise quad socket capable systems, and the 700 and 900 series comprise eight socket capable systems. The 900 series supports up to 80 CPU cores and up to 4 TB of RAM. Models with a '0' in the last digit use Intel processors while models with a '5' in the last digit use AMD processors. The RL line exclusively uses ARM-based RISC processors provided by Ampere.

ProLiant servers made by Compaq were offered with the company's own SmartStart and Insight Manager among other utilities for management. They were replaced with their HP equivalents in the years since the merger with Compaq and HP in 2002, with Insight Manager being succeeded by HP Systems Insight Manager and HP/HPE Insight Management Agents in 2003, and SmartStart being offered until 2012 with the introduction of ProLiant Gen8. The ProLiant forms part of the HP Converged Systems, which use a common Converged Infrastructure architecture for server, storage, and networking products. Designed to support 50 to 300 virtual machines, the HP ConvergedSystem 300 is configured with ProLiant servers. A system administrator can manage ProLiant servers using HP OneView for converged infrastructure management. HP also provide drivers a software for managing servers such as Management Component Pack which includes hp online configuration utility (hponcfg), Agentless Management Service amsd, Smart Storage Administrator (SSA) ssa, Smart Storage Administrator (SSA) CLI ssacli and Smart Storage Administrator Diagnostic Utility (SSADU) CLI ssaducli.

== Product lines ==
Available models through product generations (2000–present)
Model	Product generation											
Model	1 (Note: Models produced by Compaq)	2 (Note: Models produced by Compaq (pre-merger) or HP (post-merger))	3	4	5	6	7	8	9 (Note: Models produced by HP (pre-split) or HPE (post-split))	10	11	12
ML series
ML10									Yes			
ML30									Yes	Yes	Yes	
ML110		Yes	Yes	Yes	Yes	Yes	Yes		Yes	Yes	Yes	
ML115				Yes	Yes							
ML150		Yes	Yes	Yes		Yes	Yes		Yes			
ML310		Yes	Yes	Yes	Yes	Yes	Yes	Yes				
ML310e								Yes				
ML330	Yes	Yes	Yes	Yes	Yes	Yes						
ML330e	Yes											
ML350	Yes	Yes	Yes	Yes	Yes	Yes	Yes	Yes	Yes	Yes	Yes	Yes
ML350e								Yes				
ML350p								Yes				
ML370	Yes	Yes	Yes	Yes	Yes	Yes						
ML530	Yes	Yes										
ML570	Yes	Yes	Yes									
ML750	Yes											
DL series
DL20									Yes	Yes	Yes	
DL60									Yes			
DL80									Yes			
DL100		Yes										
DL120					Yes	Yes	Yes		Yes			
DL140	Yes	Yes	Yes									
DL145	Yes	Yes	Yes			Yes						
DL160					Yes	Yes		Yes	Yes	Yes		
DL165			Yes		Yes	Yes	Yes					
DL180	Yes				Yes	Yes			Yes	Yes		
DL185	Yes	Yes			Yes							
DL320	Yes	Yes	Yes	Yes	Yes	Yes		Yes			Yes	Yes
DL325										Yes	Yes	Yes
DL340												Yes
DL345											Yes	Yes
DL360	Yes	Yes	Yes	Yes	Yes	Yes	Yes	Yes	Yes	Yes	Yes	Yes
DL365	Yes				Yes					Yes	Yes	
DL370						Yes						
DL380	Yes	Yes	Yes	Yes	Yes	Yes	Yes	Yes	Yes	Yes	Yes	Yes
DL380a											Yes	Yes
DL384												Yes
DL385	Yes	Yes			Yes	Yes	Yes	Yes		Yes	Yes	
DL560	Yes							Yes	Yes	Yes	Yes	
DL580	Yes	Yes	Yes	Yes	Yes		Yes	Yes	Yes	Yes		Yes
DL585	Yes	Yes			Yes	Yes	Yes					
DL590/64		Yes										
DL740	Yes											
DL760	Yes	Yes										
DL785					Yes	Yes						
DL980			Yes				Yes					
DL1000	Yes					Yes						
DL2000					Yes		Yes		Yes			
RL series
RL300											Yes	
CL series
CL1850	Yes	—N/a	—N/a	—N/a	—N/a	—N/a	—N/a	—N/a	—N/a	—N/a	—N/a	—N/a
CL830	Yes	Yes	—N/a	—N/a	—N/a	—N/a	—N/a	—N/a	—N/a	—N/a	—N/a	—N/a
BL series
BL10e	Yes	Yes										
BL20p	Yes	Yes	Yes	Yes	Yes							
BL25p	Yes	Yes	Yes	Yes	Yes							
BL30p	Yes	Yes	Yes	Yes	Yes							
BL35p	Yes	Yes	Yes	Yes	Yes							
BL40p	Yes	Yes	Yes	Yes	Yes							
BL45p	Yes	Yes	Yes	Yes	Yes							
BL2x220c	Yes					Yes	Yes	Yes	Yes	Yes		
BL260c						Yes						
BL280c							Yes					
BL460c	Yes					Yes	Yes	Yes	Yes	Yes		
BL465c	Yes					Yes	Yes	Yes	Yes	Yes		
BL480c	Yes					Yes	Yes	Yes	Yes	Yes		
BL490c	Yes					Yes	Yes	Yes	Yes	Yes		
BL495c	Yes					Yes	Yes	Yes	Yes	Yes		
BL660c									Yes			
BL680c	Yes					Yes	Yes	Yes	Yes	Yes		
BL685c	Yes					Yes	Yes	Yes	Yes	Yes		

=== Modular Line (ML) ===
ML server models are tower-based. They aim towards maximum expandability.

=== Density Line (DL) ===
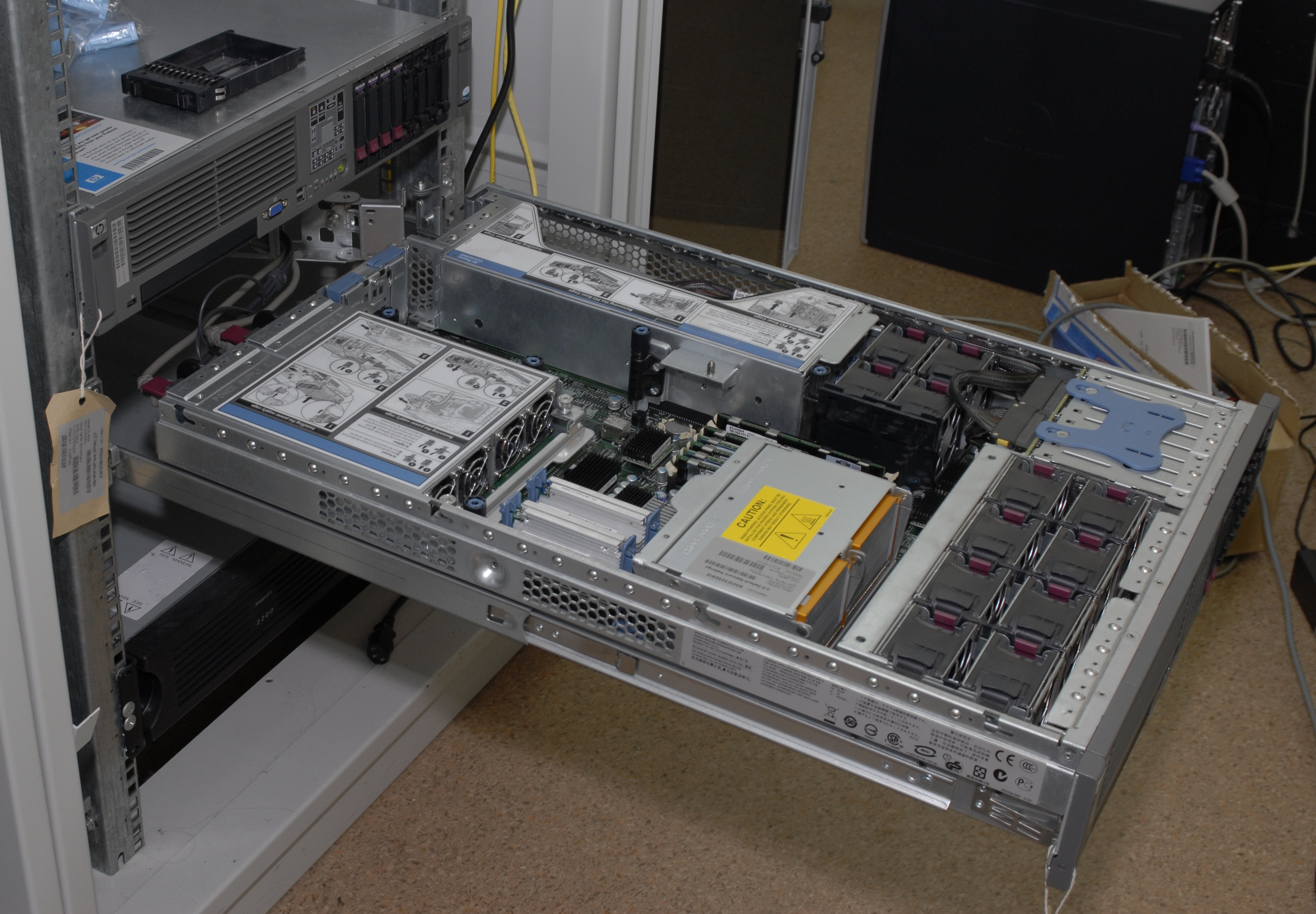
HP ProLiant DL380 G5

DL server models are rack-based. They aim towards a balance between density and computing power.

=== RISC Line (RL) ===
RL server models are rack-based, much like DL server models. These models used ARM-based RISC processors provided by Ampere (true to their name), rather than x86-based processors offered by Intel and AMD in other models, which are marketed as cloud-native servers designed to optimize cloud-native workloads.

=== Cluster Line (CL) ===
CL server models are cabinet-based, aimed at simplifying clustering for business-critical applications. They contained two server nodes and shared storage in a cost-effective, space-efficient cabinet, which can be either tower-based or rack-based depending on the configuration.

There were two models that used a cabinet-based enclosure: the Compaq ProLiant CL1850 and Compaq ProLiant CL830.

=== Scalable Line (SL) ===
SL server models are rack-based like DL and RL server models, which are mostly used in data centers and environments where a maximum of computing power is desired.

=== Blade Line (BL) ===
BL server models are enclosure-based. They are made specially for use in a blade enclosure and cannot be used without such. Blade systems aim towards maximum density and manageability at limited rack space.

There are two models of blade enclosures: HPE BladeSystem c3000 Enclosure (8 Bays for Blades), and HPE BladeSystem c7000 Enclosures (16 Bays for Blades).

One advantage of HP/HPE Blade Enclosures compared to competitors (such as IBM Blade Systems) has been that the older generation enclosures have been able to accommodate new generation BL servers just by upgrading the firmware for OA in the enclosure (Onboard Administrator). However improvements to back-plane of the enclosure in the new generation enclosures have enabled faster I/O capabilities (such as 10 Gbit/s Ethernet adapters and switches, and Infiniband). The physical design of the enclosures has not changed since the first versions (other than the larger LCD screen at the front compared to the first generation enclosures, and new plastic covers and HPE branding on the 3rd generation enclosures).

=== ProLiant MicroServer ===
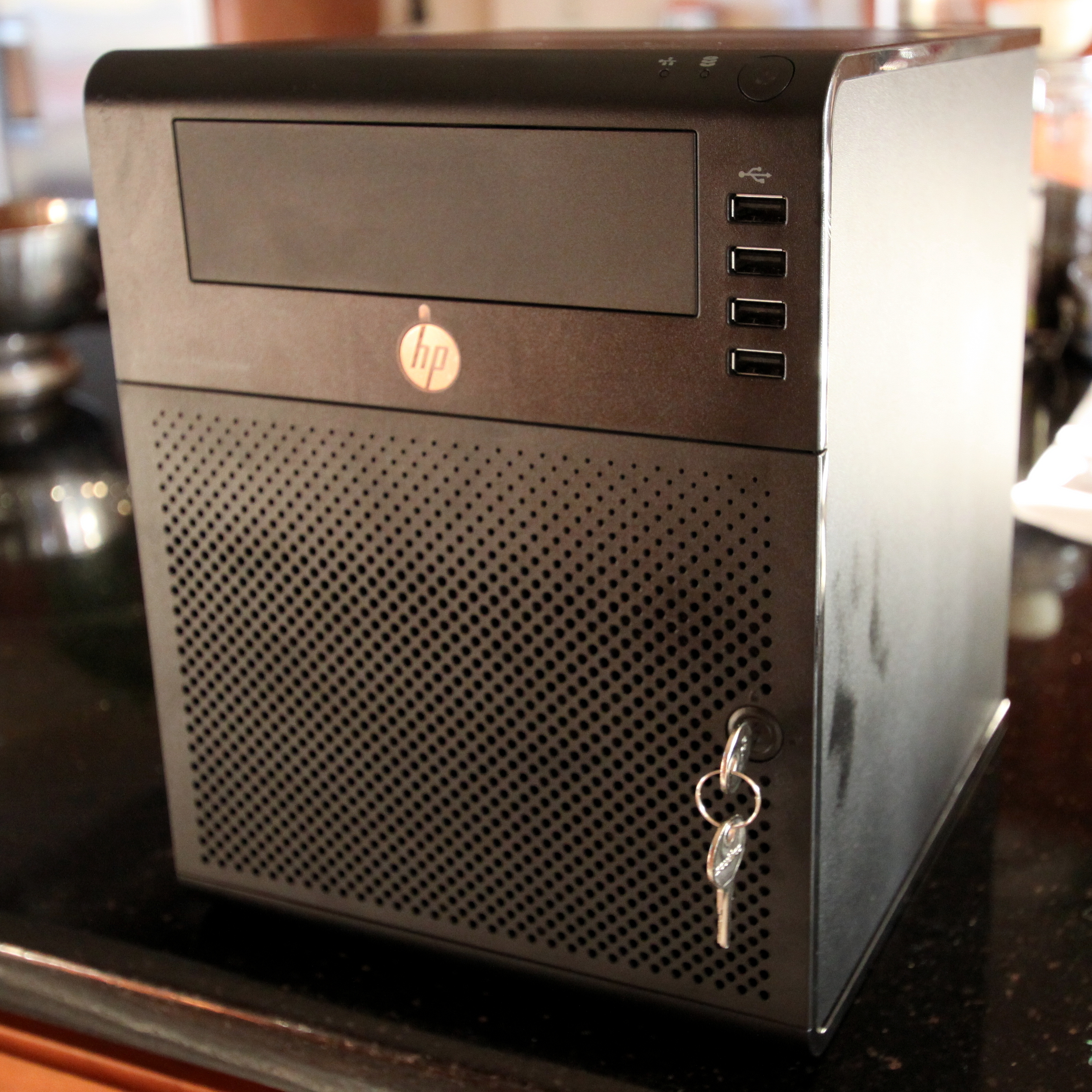
ProLiant MicroServer N36L

The HPE ProLiant MicroServer line of products are entry-level, low power, compact, and affordable servers meant for small business, home office, or edge computing. They offer user upgradable components and easy access to hard drives. There was the option to purchase the server with ClearOS installed in order for users to be able to enable applications via an easy-to-use web-GUI with minimal effort.

== Generations ==
Since Gen8, each ProLiant generation has generally coincided with a new generation of server processors, memory and expansion bus technology, along with a new version of the embedded iLO management processor.

Principal technologies by ProLiant generation (Gen8 onward)
Generation	Introduced	Main processor families	Memory	PCI Express	Embedded management
Gen8	2012	Intel Xeon E5 (Sandy Bridge-EP, Ivy Bridge-EP); AMD Opteron 6200 and 6300	DDR3	3.0	iLO 4
Gen9	2014	Intel Xeon E5-2600 v3 and v4 (Haswell-EP, Broadwell-EP)	DDR4	3.0	iLO 4
Gen10	2017	Intel Xeon Scalable, first and second generation (Skylake-SP, Cascade Lake); AMD EPYC 7001	DDR4	3.0	iLO 5
Gen10 Plus	2019 (AMD), 2021 (Intel)	Intel Xeon Scalable, third generation (Ice Lake-SP); AMD EPYC 7002 and 7003	DDR4	4.0	iLO 5
Gen11	2022	Intel Xeon Scalable, fourth and fifth generation (Sapphire Rapids, Emerald Rapids); AMD EPYC 9004; Ampere Altra and Altra Max	DDR5	5.0	iLO 6
Gen12	2024 to 2025	Intel Xeon 6; AMD EPYC; Nvidia GH200 Grace Hopper (DL384 Gen12)	DDR5	5.0	iLO 7

== Management ==
ProLiant servers include an embedded Integrated Lights-Out (iLO) management processor that provides out-of-band functions such as remote power control, power metering, hardware health monitoring, a remote console and firmware updates. Recent generations have used iLO 4 (Gen8 and Gen9), iLO 5 (Gen10 and Gen10 Plus), iLO 6 (Gen11) and iLO 7 (Gen12). Firmware, drivers and system ROM updates are distributed in bundles called the Service Pack for ProLiant (SPP), and since Gen8 the embedded Intelligent Provisioning tool has handled operating system deployment without separate installation media.

Each server includes a base iLO Standard feature set. HPE sells iLO Advanced licenses per server, bundled with one or three years of technical support and updates, which unlock features including the full integrated remote console, virtual media, directory service integration, two-factor authentication and iLO Federation group management. HPE also offers a 90-day iLO Advanced trial license. The need to purchase a license for full remote console access has been a point of criticism among some administrators.

HP OneView, announced on September 25, 2013, is HPE's converged infrastructure management platform. It initially supported BladeSystem and ProLiant Gen7 and Gen8 servers, ran as a virtual appliance with a planned hardware appliance version, and was positioned as the successor to tools such as HP Insight Control and HP Virtual Connect Enterprise Manager. HPE GreenLake for Compute Ops Management, introduced with Gen11 in 2022, is a cloud-hosted alternative sold by subscription that was also made available for Gen9 and Gen10 servers. In 2025, HPE said the new features it was adding to Compute Ops Management would be available for Gen10 and newer servers.

ProLiant servers support the major hypervisors, including VMware vSphere, Microsoft Hyper-V, KVM and Citrix XenServer. Non-HPE components such as third-party network or storage adapters may lack HPE driver support or firmware integration with iLO unless they have been certified by HPE.

== Security ==
The silicon root of trust introduced with Gen10 anchors a chain of firmware verification in the iLO 5 chip, which prevents the server from booting compromised firmware. iLO 5 can also check firmware for unauthorized changes while the server is running and restore a known-good image kept in its own non-volatile storage without taking the server offline. In the AMD-based DL385 Gen10, the silicon root of trust links to the AMD Secure Processor built into the EPYC processor, and the platform supports encryption of virtual machine memory. Intel-based Gen10 Plus servers added support for Intel SGX, and Gen11 added component authentication based on the DMTF Security Protocol and Data Model (SPDM) alongside TPM 2.0. With Gen12, iLO 7 added the "secure enclave" security processor, and HPE said iLO 7 met the requirements of the FIPS 140-3 Level 3 cryptographic standard and digitally signed firmware using a quantum-resistant signature scheme.

Like other server platforms, ProLiant servers have been affected by firmware and processor vulnerabilities. After the Spectre and Meltdown side-channel vulnerabilities were disclosed on January 3, 2018, HPE stated that full mitigation of Spectre variant 2 on affected ProLiant servers required both an operating system update and an HPE system ROM update containing new processor microcode. Following Intel's guidance on reboot problems caused by the initial microcode, HPE withdrew some of the updated Gen8 and Gen9 system ROMs and later replaced them. In September 2022, HPE disclosed CVE-2022-28639, a high-severity flaw in iLO 5 firmware version 2.71 that could allow an adjacent attacker to cause a denial of service or potentially execute arbitrary code. In October 2026, HPE disclosed CVE-2026-79820, a remote user validation failure in iLO 7 firmware version 1.25.00 rated critical, with a CVSS 3.1 base score of 9.0. HPE has also issued iLO firmware updates to address weaknesses in older SSL and TLS configurations.

== Support lifecycle ==
HPE does not publish a consolidated list of end-of-service-life (EOSL) dates for ProLiant servers. End-of-life (end-of-sale) announcements are issued as support alerts, and retired products are listed in the HPE Product Bulletin. According to HPE support staff, a product is generally retired about five years after its introduction and reaches EOSL about five years after that. For example, the DL380 Gen9 reached end of life on July 22, 2020 and EOSL on July 22, 2025, and the DL380 Gen10 is listed with an EOSL date of March 31, 2028. With Gen11, HPE extended its standard support period from three to five years, with up to seven years available. After EOSL, HPE may still offer extended support contracts at additional cost, though firmware fixes become limited.

== See also ==
- HP Integrated Lights-Out
- HP OneView
- HPE BladeSystem
- HPE Integrity Servers
- List of Hewlett-Packard products
