= HP Virtual Connect =

Technology virtualization service

HP Virtual Connect is a virtualization technology created by Hewlett-Packard (HP) that de-couples fixed blade server adapter network addresses from the associated external networks so that changes in the blade server infrastructure and the LAN and SAN environments don't require choreography among server, LAN, and SAN teams for every task. It brings virtualization to the blade server edge as it extends virtual machine technology. Virtual machine technology moves workloads across virtual machines on a single server. It becomes a challenge when moving virtual machines from one physical machine to another or between data center locations because changes to the LAN and SAN environments require manual intervention by network and storage administrators. By pooling and sharing multiple network connections across multiple servers and virtual machines, Virtual Connect extends the capability of Data Center by allowing physical setup and movement of Virtual Machine workloads between servers and Virtual Machines, transparently from the LAN and SAN infrastructure. Another name for Virtual Connect is PowerConnect Switches (the old name of the series).

Administrators can use the built-in HP Virtual Connect Manager for small configurations or the HP Virtual Connect Enterprise Manager for larger environments to define a server connection profile for each blade server bay before a server is installed. This profile establishes the Media Access Control (MAC) addresses for all network interface controllers (NICs), the World Wide Names (WWNs) for all host bus adapters (HBAs), and the Fibre Channel SAN boot parameters along with their associated network uplink connections and then associates them to a blade server bay so that even if the server is changed, the configuration and connection profile stays constant. When a new server takes its place, the same profile is associated with and used by the new server.

The technology behind Virtual Connect FlexFabric adapters and modules, part of the HP FlexNetwork Architecture, takes Virtual Connect further. Virtual Connect FlexFabric provides up to four physical functions for each blade server adapter network port, with the unique ability to fine-tune bandwidth to adapt to virtual server workload demands on the fly. All four connections can have their hardware personalities defined by the System Administrator as FlexNICs to support only Ethernet traffic as before with Virtual Connect. In addition, one of the physical functions can also be defined as a FlexHBA for Fibre Channel protocol support or an iSCSI initiator for iSCSI boot protocol support. Each function has 100 percent hardware-level performance and provides the I/O performance needed to take full advantage of multi-core processors and to support more virtual machines per physical server. Each server can support many connections—up to 24 per half-height blade—with less investment in expensive adapter cards on the server, fewer interconnect modules in the blade enclosure, and fewer expensive uplink switch ports in the corporate network. Virtual Connect as one of the technology foundations for HP CloudSystem and Converged Infrastructure allows the abstraction of the blade server infrastructure from the LAN and SAN infrastructure. This allows resources to be allocated to services in a dynamic Cloud Environment.
