= Compaq SystemPro =

Personal computer

SystemPro
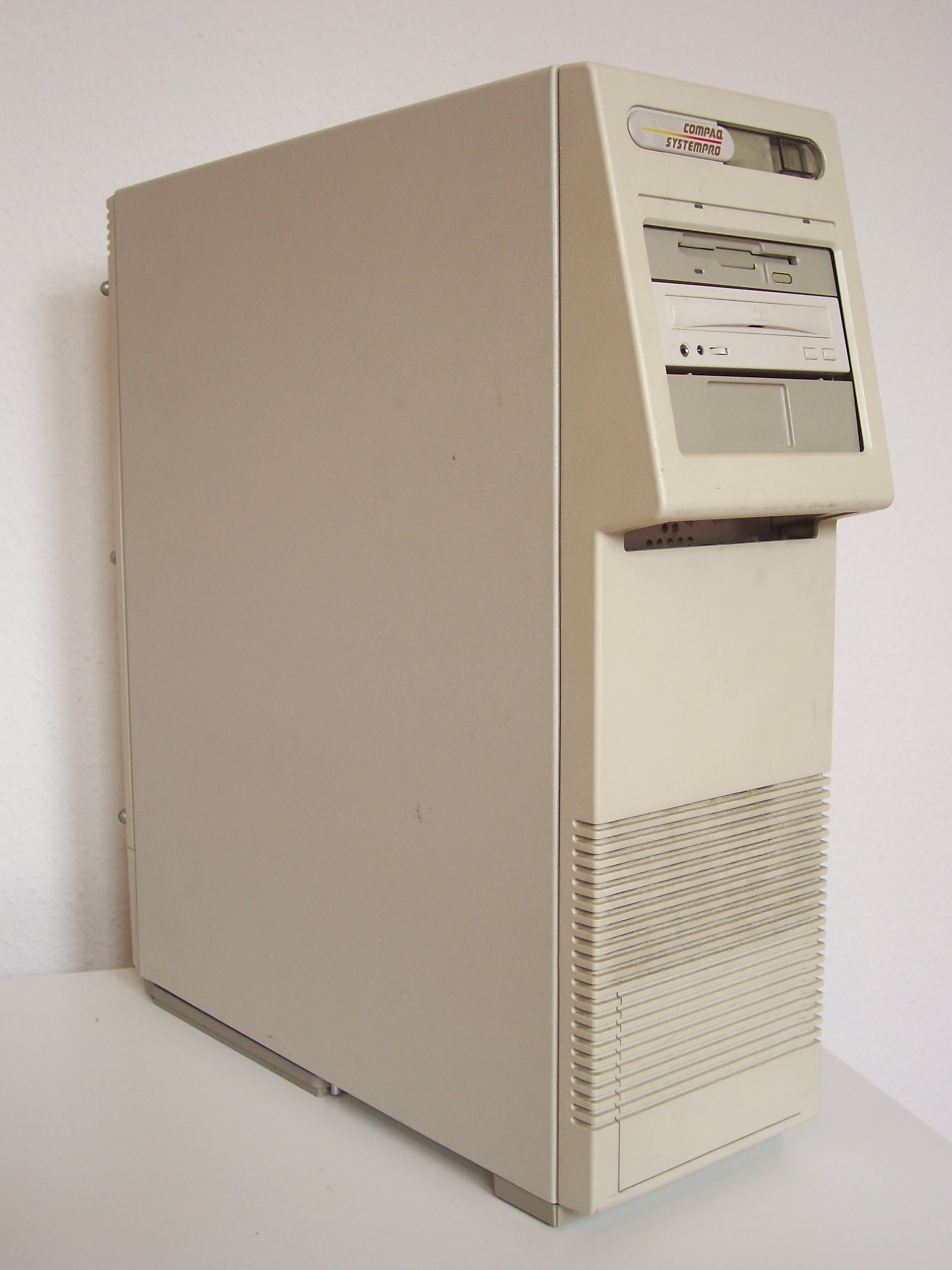
- Compaq SystemPro
- Developer: Compaq
- Type: Server
- Released: 1989 (as SystemPro); 1992 (as SystemPro XL)
- Discontinued: 1993
- Successor: Compaq ProSignia (as mid-range); Compaq ProLiant (as hi-end)
- Related: Compaq Deskpro

The SystemPro from Compaq, released in November 1989, is a computer capable of running server-based computer operating systems and was arguably the first true PC based server. It supports Intel's 486 chip, a 32-bit bus, RAID disk and dual-processor support well before its main rivals.

== Features ==
The SystemPro, along with the simultaneously released Compaq Deskpro 486, was one of the first two commercially available computer systems containing the new EISA bus. The SystemPro was also one of the first PC-style systems specifically designed as a network server, and as such was built from the ground up to take full advantage of the EISA bus. It included such features as multiprocessing (the original systems were asymmetric-only), hardware RAID, and bus-mastering network cards. All models of SystemPro used a full-height tower configuration, with eight internal hard drive bays. As well as the provision for an 80387 maths coprocessor chip, the processor card also included a socket for a Weitek maths coprocessor chip. Support for the Weitek function needed to be especially provided in the application, it did not use the same instruction set as the 80387 chip. The Weitek socket (empty) is the multi-pin triple-row socket to the right on the CPU-board closeup.

=== Multiprocessing ===
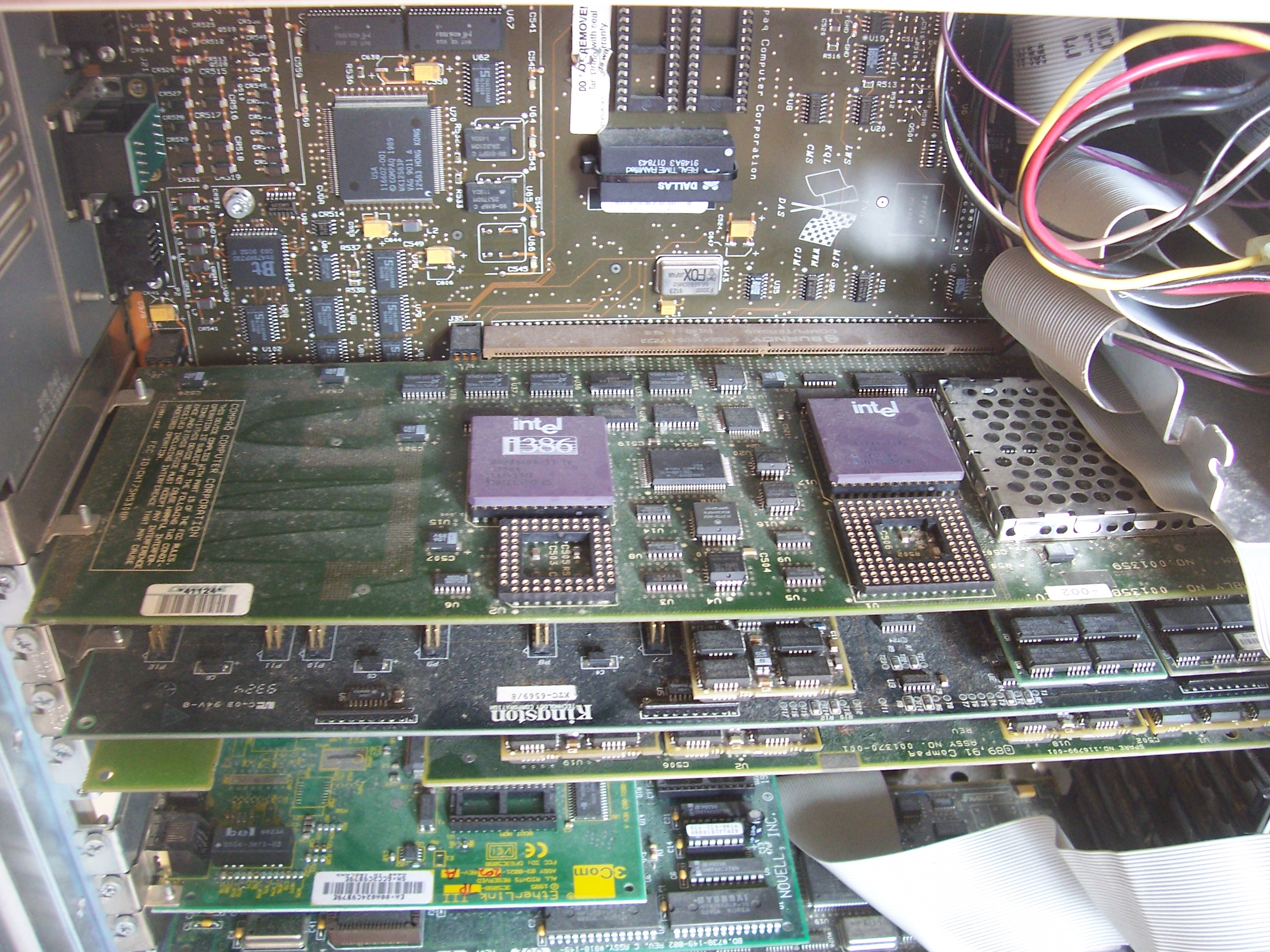
CPU-board closeup

At its initial release in November 1989, the SystemPro supported up to two 33 MHz 386 processors, but early in 1990, 33 MHz 486 processors became an option (the processors were housed on proprietary daughterboards). Because the system was asymmetric, 386 and 486 processors could be mixed. Single processor configurations were also available.

The only operating system which fully supported the SystemPro's asymmetric multiprocessing was a custom version of SCO Unix, sold by Compaq. However, when running OS/2, certain applications (notably Sybase SQL Server) could be offloaded to the second processor, and later, Novell NetWare SFT-III was able to offload its I/O engine. The original versions of Windows NT (3.1) included a hardware abstraction layer specifically for the SystemPro; despite NT's symmetric multiprocessing design, this HAL could offload some kernel tasks to the second CPU. This made Windows NT 3.1 the only version of Windows to support multiprocessor 386-based machines.

=== System/Memory Architecture ===
The system used a state-of-the-art shared memory bus design, called Tri-Flex Architecture, to facilitate its multiprocessing capabilities. The original SystemPro shipped with 4MB 80ns DRAM, expandable up to 256MB using proprietary memory modules.

=== RAID ===
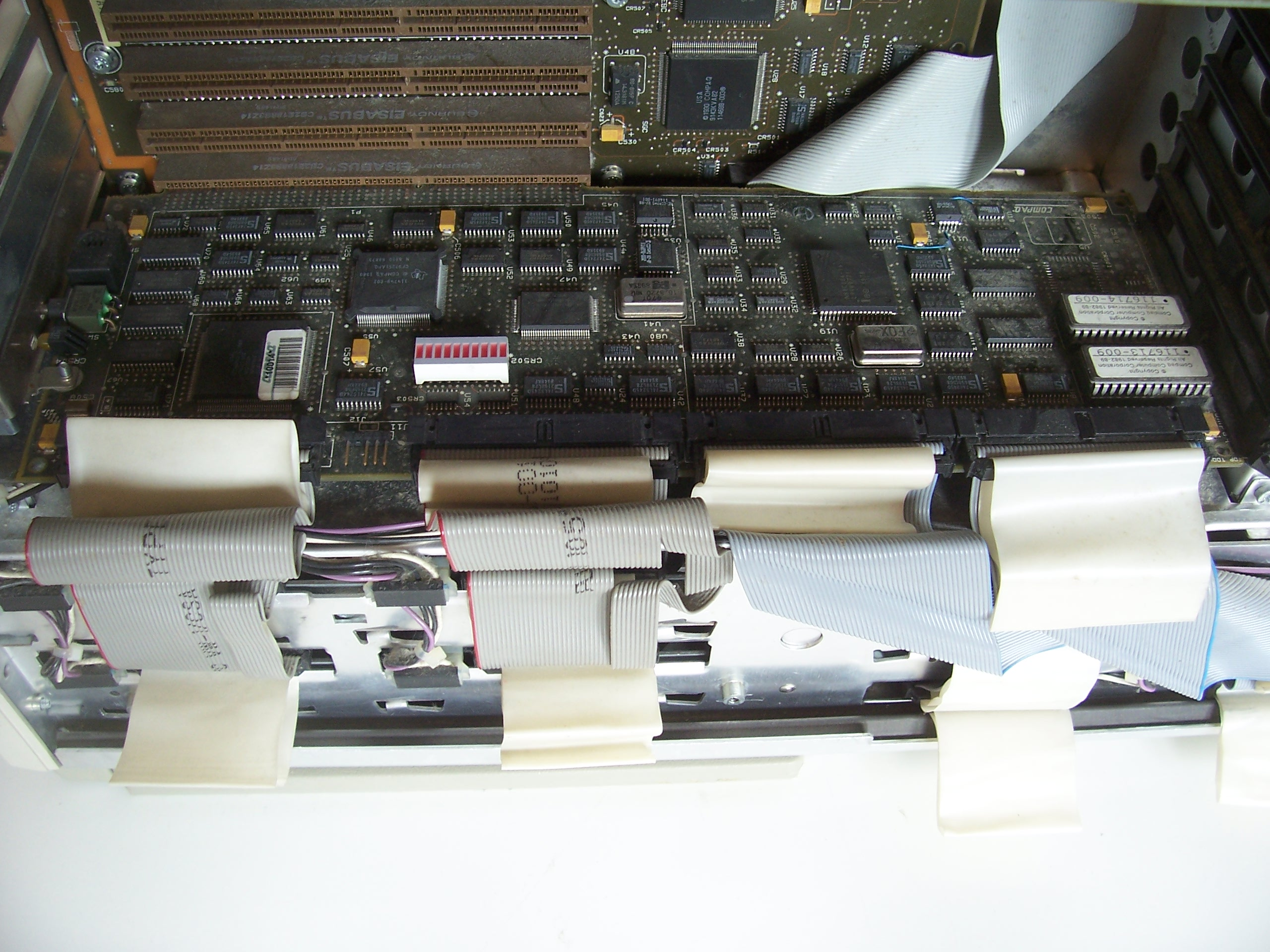
RAID-Controller closeup

The SystemPro also offered one of the first implementations of RAID (including RAID 5) available on a PC-based system. The original RAID card, called the IDA (Intelligent Drive Array) used a proprietary form of IDE, supporting up to 4 drives internally. At its release, the largest drive available was 210 MB. Two IDA cards could be installed, allowing all 8 hard drive bays to be filled (each IDA controller array would appear as a separate logical drive to the operating system, however), providing a grand total of 1.2 GB using RAID 5, or 1.6 GB using non-redundant striping (RAID 0). Another option called the IDA Expansion Array provided support for up to 7 drives in a single array (housed in an external tower chassis looking virtually identical to the SystemPro itself), using an early (and very proprietary) form of differential SCSI. Note that all hard drives in the SystemPro or the Expansion Array were internally mounted drives; hot swapping was not an option. System for RAID performance and health monitoring patented in 1993.

== Market ==
The SystemPro was marketed for those who had scaled up to the top end of LAN hardware, or those who were scaling down from minicomputers — and its pricing was set accordingly. At the time of launch, the "low-end" SystemPro (a single 33-MHz 386 CPU, 4 MB RAM, and two 120-MB hard drives) listed for $15,999 (USD); the same machine with 840 MB of storage (four 210-MB hard drives) listed for $25,999 (USD). A second 386 processor card cost $3,500 (USD), and an additional 32 MB of RAM was $21,999 (USD).

== Legacy ==
The SystemPro line continued for several years, ending with the SystemPro XL, which was introduced in 1992. The XL was the only model that supported symmetric multiprocessing. It was replaced, also in 1992, by Compaq's ProSignia line, and later the ProLiant series, which introduced hot swappable drives and the rack mount chassis now popular in data centers. However, the SystemPro is notable for having established the PC-based server market, and setting a high-water mark for the servers that followed.
