= HP ConvergedSystem =

Portfolio of system-based products

HP ConvergedSystem is a portfolio of system-based products from Hewlett-Packard (HP) that integrates preconfigured IT components into systems for virtualization, cloud computing, big data, collaboration, converged management, and client virtualization. Composed of servers, storage, networking, and integrated software and services, the systems are designed to address the cost and complexity of data center operations and maintenance by pulling the IT components together into a single resource pool so they are easier to manage and faster to deploy. Where previously it would take three to six months from the time of order to get a system up and running, it now reportedly takes as few as 20 days with the HP ConvergedSystem.

HP ConvergedSystem uses a common Converged infrastructure architecture, the same common foundation used for all HP server, storage, and networking products. HP Converged Infrastructure pools resources so that they can be shared across different applications while being managed from a standardized management platform and security software. The convergence of server, storage, and networking can help user organizations save investment on equipment maintenance and management.

HP Converged Systems includes HP ConvergedSystem for Virtualization, for developing and managing virtualized environments; HP CloudSystem, for building and managing cloud computing services across private, public and hybrid clouds; HP ConvergedSystem for Big Data, for loading, analyzing and managing vast quantities of data;

HP ConvergedSystem for Collaboration, for configuration and deployment of Microsoft unified communications software; HP OneView for converged infrastructure management; and HP ConvergedSystem for Client Virtualization, for running Virtual desktop infrastructure.

HP CloudSystem is an integrated cloud infrastructure for delivering private, public, and hybrid cloud services. It integrates HP cloud software with HP servers, storage, and networking technologies into a single system.

The HP OneView converged infrastructure management product provides a unified interface that lets users automate formerly labor-intensive manual Data center management and maintenance tasks, as part of a Software-defined data center.

== HP ConvergedSystem for Virtualization ==
HP ConvergedSystem for Virtualization consists of a series of integrated server, storage and networking infrastructures that offer scalability with modular virtualization systems that can support 50 to 1,000 virtual machines each. The HP ConvergedSystem 300, designed to support 50 to 300 virtual machines, comes configured with HP ProLiant servers. The HP ConvergedSystem 700 is designed for larger enterprise installations of 100 to more than 1,000 virtual machines and comes configured with HP BladeSystem servers. For both models, customers can choose between VMware or Microsoft virtualization environments. Customers of the 700 model can also install their own virtualization software. All of the models are managed from a single console. It has been reported that HP ConvergedSystem for Virtualization performs twice as fast and costs 25 percent less than competing systems.

== HP CloudSystem ==
HP CloudSystem is used by enterprises and service providers to build and manage private, public and hybrid cloud services. The system includes a consumer-style user interface and streamlined management tools. Based on HP Converged Infrastructure, HP CloudSystem modular infrastructure and HP Cloud Service Automation Software, CloudSystem integrates servers, storage, networking, security, and management to automate the application and infrastructure lifecycle for service delivery via private and hybrid clouds.

HP CloudSystem is a component of HP Converged Cloud, which combines software and cloud services into a unified set of packages and under a single unified architecture. HP CloudSystem is built on HP Cloud OS, which features OpenStack technology and enables users to choose from multiple hypervisors and operating systems, including those from Microsoft and VMware. HP CloudSystem can automatically shift workloads to external clouds during busy periods, based on pre-defined business policies. Supported public clouds include those from Arsys and SFR, as well as Amazon Web Services and Microsoft Windows Azure. This function is commonly known as cloud bursting.

HP CloudSystem has lifecycle management tools to automate the process of application provisioning, customization and configuration, patch management and retirement. HP CloudSystem Foundation features the core components. Additional management capabilities and a simplified installation are included with HP CloudSystem Enterprise.

== HP ConvergedSystem for Big Data ==
HP ConvergedSystem for Big Data provides workload-specific, single-purpose systems that support tasks for which performance is critical, such as Data analytics, Data warehousing, and business applications. Software applications are pre-integrated and designed for the integrated hardware, networking, and storage components. The HP ConvergedSystem 300 for Vertica is designed for businesses that run the HP Vertica data analytics solution. The system works with the Cloudera, Hortonworks, and MapR versions of Apache Hadoop. It has been reported that the system can operate from 50 to 1,000 times faster than competitors’ data warehouse offerings. The HP ConvergedSystem 300 for Microsoft Analytics Platform System (APS) includes SQL Server Parallel Data Warehouse (PDW) and can be configured with HDInsight Hadoop nodes. It is possible to run PolyBase queries against SQL Server PDW and Cloudera, Apache, or Hortonworks HDP nodes.

The HP ConvergedSystem 500 for SAP HANA operates the SAP HANA in-memory data management platform for data analytics and data warehousing. It has been reported that the system can process data analytics twice as fast as competing systems for SAP HANA. The HP ConvergedSystem 500 for SAP HANA includes ConvergedSystem 500 hardware and HP ServiceGuard for SAP HANA, a data management tool that protects against unscheduled downtime by providing the capability for automatic failover. The HP ConvergedSystem 500 for SAP HANA enables users to run data analytics and Enterprise resource planning (ERP) on the same workload-based system. It has been reported that data analytics processes that used to take days or weeks to run can now be accessed in real-time. The HP ConvergedSystem 900 for SAP HANA is designed to manage and analyze very large and varied data sets. It has been reported that the HP ConvergedSystem 900 for SAP HANA is capable of supplying 12 terabytes of data in one memory pool.

== HP ConvergedSystem for Collaboration ==
HP ConvergedSystem for Collaboration integrates hardware, software and services to provide Unified communications for specific platforms. The pre-supplied workload configurations include the HP Collaboration Solutions for Microsoft SharePoint Server. These include HP SharePoint Business Decision for business intelligence and combines HP ProLiant Gen8 servers with SharePoint 2013 and SQL Server’s Power View. It has been reported that the system takes less than an hour to install and launch.

HP ConvergedSystems Solutions for Microsoft Exchange Server is designed for users to deploy a business email system in a modular, simplified manner. HP Converged Systems Solutions for Microsoft Lync Server streamlines deployment of Microsoft Lync communications for voice, instant messaging and video and includes a reference architecture for small to medium enterprises.

== HP OneView for Converged Infrastructure Management ==
HP OneView for converged infrastructure management enables data center administrators to perform automated lifecycle management for HP servers, as part of a software-defined data center. Unlike legacy converged infrastructure management software, which focuses on managing devices, HP OneView is designed to help administrators enable tasks. Administrators can view resources and their relationships through a visual map and use the Representational state transfer (REST) application programming interface (API) to automate system management tasks.

The HP OneView interface is modeled after consumer applications, to more efficiently manage HP BladeSystem and HP ProLiant generation 7 and 8 servers, with support for HP Moonshot Arm servers planned. It has been reported that because of HP OneView’s deep knowledge of these servers and HP Virtual Connect virtualization technology, administrators can deploy a 16-node Computer cluster 12 times faster than they could using manual operations.

Administrators can also use HP OneView to provision and maintain Firmware across HP BladeSystem enclosures, servers, and Virtual Connect modules, as well as manage a Virtual LAN (VLAN) through the network edge.

An HP OneView Plug-in for the VMware vCenter virtualization console enables administrators to work directly through the vCenter console. Operations for VMware vSphere hosts and clusters can be managed and automated, reducing the number of steps it takes to carry out tasks like setting up a new cluster.

== HP ConvergedSystem for Client Virtualization ==
HP ConvergedSystem 100 for Hosted Desktops works with the software-defined HP Moonshot m700 microserver systems and includes software, hardware and services to provide users with an environment for running Virtual desktops. Each user gets a dedicated CPU and GPU, which removes the need for a hypervisor. According to published reports, the Moonshot server consumes up to 63 percent less power than competing systems, and can lower the total cost of ownership by 44 percent compared to standard desktop computer systems. Built as a joint effort with AMD and Citrix, the system is reported to provide graphics that are six times faster than those of competing products. Client virtualization also provides a way for users to more securely access business applications and data from mobile devices.
