= PC Weasel 2000 =

PC Weasel 2000 was a line of graphics cards designed by Middle Digital Incorporated (Herb Peyerl and Jonathan Levine) which output to a serial port instead of a monitor. This allows servers using PC hardware with conventional BIOSes or operating systems lacking serial capability to be administered remotely.

The product was introduced in 1999 and began shipping January 20, 2000.

PCI and ISA models are available. The PC Weasel is also connected to a PS/2-compatible keyboard port and effectively emulates a keyboard by converting characters obtained from the serial port to keyboard scancodes. The card may also be connected to the reset pins of the motherboard and reboot the machine on command.

The PC Weasel is an open-source product. Every purchaser of the board is granted a license for the card's onboard microcontroller. The microcode, stored in flash memory, is modifiable using a gcc-based toolchain.

== See also ==
- Lights out management (LOM)
- Network Console on Acid (NCA)
- coreboot
