= Perle Systems =

Manufacturer of device networking hardware

Perle Systems Inc.
- Type: Private
- Industry: Information technology
- Founded: 1976; 50 years ago
- Headquarters: Princeton, New Jersey, U.S.
- Key people: Joseph E. Perle (CEO); John Feeney (COO); Derrick Barnett (CFO)
- Number of employees: 50 (2016)
- Website: perle.com

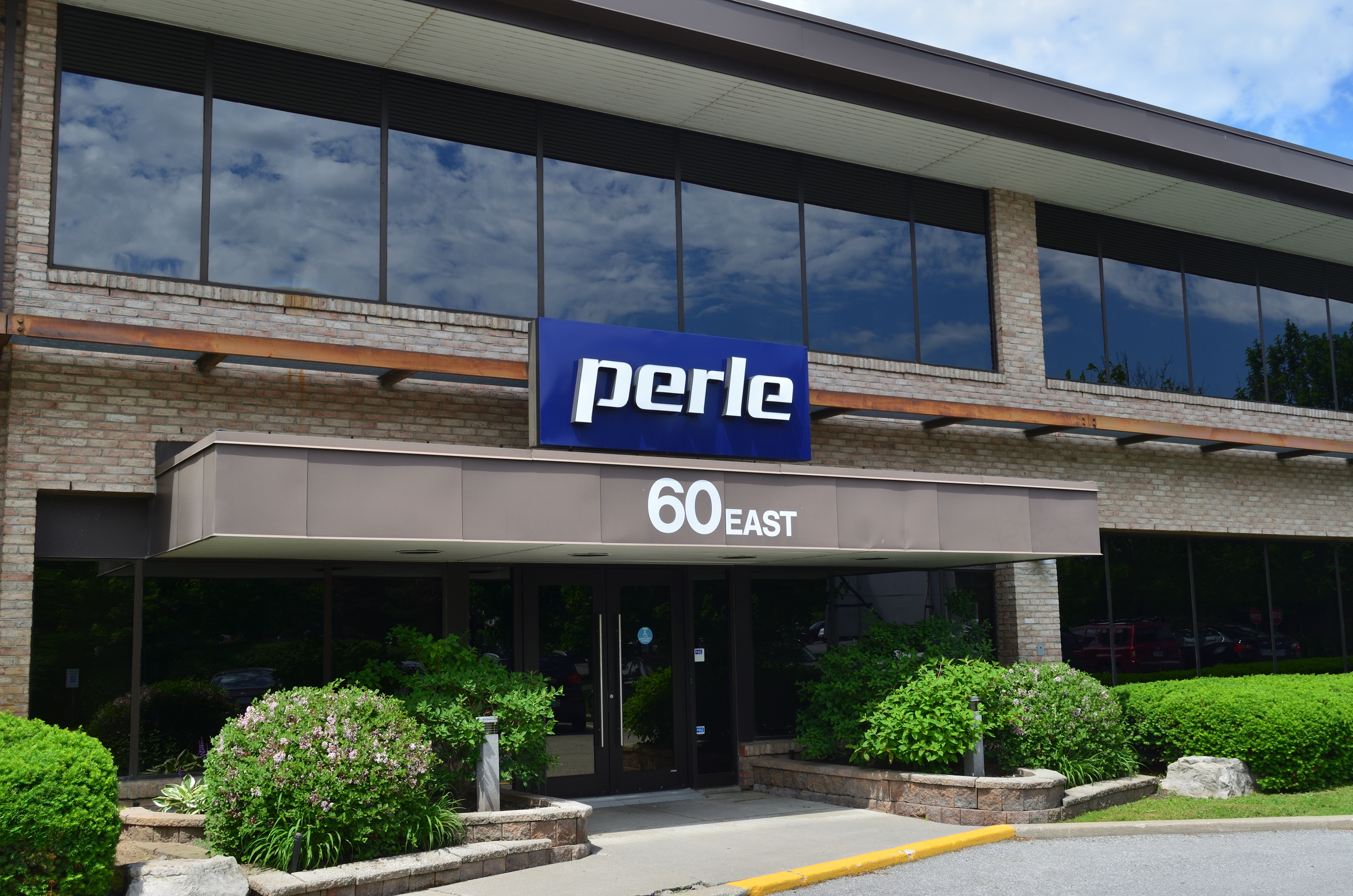
Perle Systems

Perle Systems is a technology company that develops and manufactures serial to Ethernet, fiber to Ethernet, I/O connectivity, and device networking equipment. These types of products are commonly used to establish network connectivity across multiple locations, securely transmit sensitive information across a LAN, and remotely monitor and control networked devices via out-of-band management.

Perle has offices and representative offices in North America, Europe, and Asia and sells its products through distribution and OEM (original equipment manufacturer) channels worldwide.

On August 31, 2016, Phoenix Contact GmbH & Co. KG, Blomberg, Germany concluded a contract for the acquisition of Perle Systems Limited, Toronto. Thus, Perle Systems becomes an international subsidiary of the Phoenix Contact Group.

== Products ==
- 5G and LTE Routers: Use to provide primary or failover back-up connectivity to remote infrastructure and assets through wireless cellular connections
- Terminal Servers: Used to connect any device with serial ports over Ethernet for access to network server applications. Examples of devices with serial ports include Cisco console ports, POS terminals, servers, modems, card readers and a wide range of industrial equipment.
- Device Servers: Used to web or network enable existing equipment with RS-232, RS-422 or RS-485 serial interfaces.
- Console Servers: Used to provide data center managers with secure remote management of Cisco routers, switches and firewalls, Solaris, Windows, Unix and Linux servers, PBXs or any device with a serial console port. Also referred to as out-of-band management of IT assets.
- Ethernet I/O Device Servers: Used for access and control of remote digital I/O, analog I/O, pulse I/O, relays and temperature sensors on any IP network. Monitor environmental alarms, intrusion detection, relay contact closures and equipment failure.
- Remote Power Switches: Used to remotely power on/off/cycle Data Center equipment.
- Serial Cards: Used to add RS-232, RS-422, RS-485 serial ports to PCs or servers via PCI, PCI-X or PCI Express bus slots.
- Parallel Cards: Used to add IEEE 1284 Parallel ports to PCs or servers via PCI, PCI-X or PCI Express bus slots.
- Fiber Media Converters: Used to extend copper to fiber, multimode to multimode and multimode to single mode fiber
- Ethernet extenders: Used to transparently extend 10/100/1000 Ethernet connections across copper wiring
- Industrial Ethernet network switches
- Small Form-factor Pluggable transceivers and XFP transceivers

== History ==
- 1976, Perle Systems is founded.
- 1977, Establishes manufacturing capabilities.
- 1983, Launches a new family of ATM Controllers.
- 1985, Stock goes public.
- 1987, Introduces standardized IBM Midrange and AS/400 products.
- 1998, Acquires Specialix. Specialix designed, developed, manufactured, and marketed a broad range of serial connectivity and remote access solutions that provided connectivity between PCs/servers and peripheral devices.
- 1999, Acquires Zeta Communication Limited for its IP routing technology.
- 2000, Acquires Chase Research. Chase Research designed, developed, manufactured, and marketed serial to Ethernet and remote access products.
- 2003, Stock goes private.
- 2004, Incorporates RS-232, RS-422 and RS-485 interfaces on a single PCI serial card and provide the ability to individually configure each interface type using software commands.
- 2005, Incorporates IPV6 support into IOLAN Terminal Servers.; Launches serial card line that supports the PCI Express bus standard.
- 2006, Launches IOLAN Terminal Server that connect remote serial devices that operate in extreme temperatures (-40F to +165F ) to an enterprise IP network.; Launches a line of I/O Device Servers with the ability to monitor environmental alarms, intrusion detection, relay contact closures and equipment failure over Ethernet.
- 2007, Launches Redundant Path Technology and Remote Power Switches.
- 2008, Releases a line of SPEED LE Parallel PCI Card; Launches Spanish and Italian websites; Launches the IOLAN SCS48C DC Console Server for remote management of telecommunications equipment.
- 2009, Launches IOLAN Terminal Server specifically designed for medical data collection applications and certified for IEC 60601-1; Launches Terminal Servers for Electrical Utility Substation Market that meet NERC CIP and EPCIP requirements; Launches Terminal Server Certified as Class 1 Div2; Launches Terminal Server with HTTP tunneling
- 2010, Launches Ethernet to Fiber Media Converters; Launches NEBS Level 3 Compliant Console Servers; Achieves ISO 9001:2008 Certification.
- 2011, Extends Fiber Optic Cabling Support to 160 km; Launches FIPS 140-2 Validated IOLAN Terminal Servers. - Needs further validation. No validated hardware can be found on NIST https://csrc.nist.rip/groups/STM/cmvp/documents/140-1/140val-historical.htm Item could be compliant, but not validated
- 2012, Launches Industrial Temperature Media Converters; Launches Ethernet Copper Extenders
- 2013, Launches 10G Media Converters
- 2014, Launches Industrial Ethernet Switches
- 2015, Launches Wireless Serial Device Servers
- 2016, Phoenix Contact acquires Perle Systems
- 2017, Perle Enables Serial over Cellular Network Data Transmission; Launches PoE Industrial Managed Switches; Launches IOLAN SCSC Console Servers with dual SFP slots; Releases 10G Media Converters capable of 10/100/1000/2500/10000 Rate Conversion;
- 2018, Launches eR-S1110 Ethernet Repeater; Launches Modular Console Servers for In-Band and Out-of-Band-Management;
- 2019, Launches Console Servers with integrated 4G LTE for Out-of-Band-Management; Launches Enterprise-Class Edge Cellular LTE Routers & Gateways;
- 2020, Launches a 10-port PoE (100W) Gigabit Switch with Fiber or Copper uplink ports; Launches IOLAN SCR1618 Secure Out-of-Band Management Console Server;
- 2021, Launches FirstNet™ Ready LTE Routers;
- 2022, Launches Enterprise-Class Edge 5G Routers;
