= HPE Integrated Lights-Out =

Out-of-band management platform by HP

Integrated Lights-Out (iLO) is a proprietary embedded server management technology by Hewlett Packard Enterprise which provides out-of-band management facilities. The physical connection is an RJ45 port that can be found on most ProLiant servers and microservers of the 300 and above series.

iLO has similar functionality to the lights out management (LOM) technology offered by other vendors, for example, Sun/Oracle's LOM port, Dell DRAC, the IBM Remote Supervisor Adapter and Cisco CIMC.

== Features ==
iLO makes it possible to perform activities on a Compaq, HP or HPE server from a remote location. The iLO card has a separate network connection (and its own IP address) to which one can connect via HTTPS. Possible options are:

- Reset the server (in case the server doesn't respond anymore via the network card)
- Power-up the server (possible to do this from a remote location, even if the server is shut down)
- Remote system console (in some cases however an 'Advanced license' may be required for some of the utilities to work)
- Mount remote physical CD/DVD drive or image (virtual media), depends on license.
- Access the server's Integrated Management Log (IML)
- Can be manipulated remotely through XML-based Remote Insight Board Command Language (RIBCL)
- Full command-line interface support through RS-232 port (shared with system), though the inability to enter function keys prevents certain operations
- SSH remote network access to iLO card supporting public key authentication, 1024 bit DSA key, at least since iLO 3
- iLO Federation
- Two factor authentication
- Remote syslog, depends on license.

iLO provides some other utilities virtual power and a remote console. iLO is either embedded on the system board, or available as a PCI card.

== Availability ==
iLO is embedded or available on some HPE ProLiant and Integrity servers.

Prior to iLO, Compaq created several other lights out management products. The original was the Remote Insight Board (RIB), which was available as an EISA or PCI expansion card. RIB was replaced with RILOE (Remote Insight Lights-Out Edition), which was only available for PCI. The original RILOE was replaced with RILOE II. HP stopped manufacturing RILOE II in 2006. The final firmware version for RILOE is 2.53(A) dated 9 Mar 2004 and for RILOE II is 1.21 dated 5 July 2006.

For G7 and older ProLiant 100 series servers there is a "Lights Out 100" option, which has more limited functionality. The LO100 is a traditional IPMI BMC, and does not share hardware or firmware with iLO. ProLiant 100 series servers starting with Gen9 include iLO.

There is also a version of iLO for HP Moonshot systems referred to as iLO Chassis Management which is often abbreviated as iLO CM. The Chassis Management version of iLO was derived from iLO 4. As of June 2018 the most recent Chassis Manager Firmware available is version 1.56 which was released as part of the Moonshot Component Pack 2018.02.0.

Although HP included iLO functionality in the ProLiant Gen8 MicroServer, they removed it from the Gen10 version. The ProLiant MicroServer Gen10+ and Gen11 has an iLO add-on card.

== Versions ==
There have been multiple generations of iLO, each generation noted by a single digit number ("iLO 2"). Some generations of iLO are segmented into different editions, based on what features are licensed. iLO includes updatable firmware, for which HP periodically releases new versions.

Name	Servers	Latest Firmware
iLO	ProLiant G2, G3, G4, and G6 (model numbers under 300)	1.96 released 30 April 2014 (EOL)
iLO 2	ProLiant G4, G5, and G6 (model numbers 300 and higher)	2.33 released 30 March 2018 (EOL)
iLO 3	ProLiant G7	1.94 released 17 December 2020 (EOL)
iLO 4	ProLiant Gen8 and Gen9	2.82 released 2 March 2023 (EOL)
iLO 5	ProLiant Gen10 and Gen10 Plus	3.21 released 31 July 2026
iLO 6	ProLiant Gen11	1.78 released 31 July 2026
iLO 7	ProLiant Gen12	1.24.00 released 2 August 2026
iLO 8	ProLiant Gen13	

== Programming Interfaces ==
Several tools or APIs exist for interacting with HPE iLO:

- Ansible: hponcfg module
- Perl: Net::ILO
- Python: python-hpilo
- Ruby: ILOrb
- PowerShell: Scripting Tools for Windows PowerShell: iLO cmdlets

iLO 4 introduced a HTTP API to manage the functionality.

This served as the inspiration for the Redfish standard developed by the DMTF, which is implemented in iLO 5. It can be managed in an industry standard way, by all Redfish compatible tools. However, since Redfish allows the vendors to add custom functionality to their Redfish API, HPE forked the DMTF's tools and included additional functionality.

== Security issues ==
In December 2021 Iranian researchers at Amnpardaz security firm have discovered rootkits in HPE's iLO (Integrated Lights-Out) management modules.

== See also ==
- Intel Active Management Technology (iAMT)
- Intelligent Platform Management Interface (IPMI)
- List of Hewlett-Packard products
- Out-of-band management
