= Opengear =

Company that manufactures out-of-band management systems

Opengear, Inc.
- Type: Public
- Industry: computer network management technology
- Founded: 2004
- Headquarters: Sandy, Utah, U.S.
- Area served: Worldwide
- Key people: Patrick Quirk, Senior Vice President, General Manager
- Products: Serial and network console servers, Management gateways, Smart Out-of-Band management
- Website: opengear.com

Opengear is a global computer network technology company headquartered in Sandy, Utah, U.S., with engineering in Brisbane, Qld, Australia.

The company develops and manufactures "smart out-of-band infrastructure management" products aimed at allowing customers to securely access, control and automatically troubleshoot and repair their IT infrastructure remotely, including network and data-center management, for resilient operation.

Opengear solutions provide always-available wired and wireless secure remote access, with failover capabilities to automatically restore site connectivity. This enables technical staff to provision, maintain and repair infrastructure from anywhere at any time, as if they were physically present, thereby enabling both the operational costs and the risk of downtime to be reduced.

In December 2019, Opengear was acquired by Digi International.

== Products ==
Opengear's management products include IM7200 advanced console servers that streamline management of network, server, and power infrastructure in data centers and colocation facilities; and ACM7000 remote management gateways that deliver secure remote monitoring, access and control of distributed networks and remote sites. The Lighthouse Centralized Management platform then provides a single point of scalable, secure management for these Opengear appliances and connected devices.

All Opengear products provide a secure alternate out-of-band path to the managed infrastructure, enabling accessibility even during system or network outage. They monitor, access, and control all critical infrastructure at all local and remote sites, from applications, computers and networking equipment, to security cameras, power supplies and door sensors - to proactively detect faults and remediate before they become failures.

Opengear's products are built on a Linux software base, and the company is an active supporter of the open-source community.

== History ==
- 2004 Opengear founded by the founders of SnapGear
- 2005 Started okvm open source project, developing open source console and KVM management software and released CM4000 and SD4000 product lines (built on okvm technology)
- 2007 Embedded Nagios open source monitoring software.
- 2008 Embedded Network UPS Tools and PowerMan for UPS and PDU management and monitoring, EMD5000 Environmental Monitoring Products.
- 2009 Extended SNMP support for all mainstream UPS and PDU vendors for true vendor agnostic data center management.
- 2010 Develops VCMS virtual central management - built on Nagios
- 2010 Reports sales growth of 50% in 2010.
- 2011 Embeds ARMS in management gateways to give smart remote hands
- 2012 Releases extended ACM5000 with cellular and PoE and Lighthouse Central Management
- 2012 Reports revenue growth of 50% in North America and 78% in Europe.
- 2013 Releases IM7200 product line, with integrated fiber and 4GLTE
- 2014 Introduced the arrival of the IM4200-2-DAC-X2-GS to its IM4200 remote infrastructure management line of products, certified by Sprint.
- 2014 Releases CM7100 Console Server
- 2014 Opengear releases a new version of Lighthouse with a Console Gateway
- 2014 Integrated Failover To Cellular functionality to all cellular-enabled ACM remote-site management and IM infrastructure management devices
- 2015 Releases Resilience Gateway (ACM7004) product line, with Smart Out-Of-Band management and Failover to Cellular integration.
- 2017 Lighthouse 5 Centralized Management software platform released
- 2018 Operations Manager OM2200 appliance for NetOps management released
- 2018 NetOps Automation Platform launched, to streamline NetOps workflows
- 2019 NetOps Console Server launched, combining NetOps tools and Out-of-Band in a single appliance
- 2019 Opengear purchased by Digi International
