= IBM Remote Supervisor Adapter =

Full-length ISA or PCI adapter by IBM

The IBM Remote Supervisor Adapter is a full-length ISA or PCI adapter produced by the IBM corporation.

== Adapter versions ==
=== Advanced Systems Management Adapter (ASMA) ===
This is a full-length ISA or PCI adapter. The ISA version is very rare, and was only ever supported in one or two servers. This adapter can be accessed either in-band through a device driver, or out-band over serial or 10Mbit Ethernet.

In addition, this adapter supports chaining of IBM Servers with Advanced Systems Management Processors (ASMP) using RJ45 patch cables (RS-485 signal), to reduce the number of

- IBM Netfinity 5000, 5100, 5500, 5500 M10, 5500 M20, 5600
- IBM Netfinity 6000R
- IBM Netfinity 7000 M10, 7100, 7600
- IBM Netfinity 8500R
- IBM eServer xSeries 230, 240, 250
- IBM eServer xSeries 330 (8654), 340, 350, 370

=== Remote Supervisor Adapter II (RSA-II) 73P9265 ===
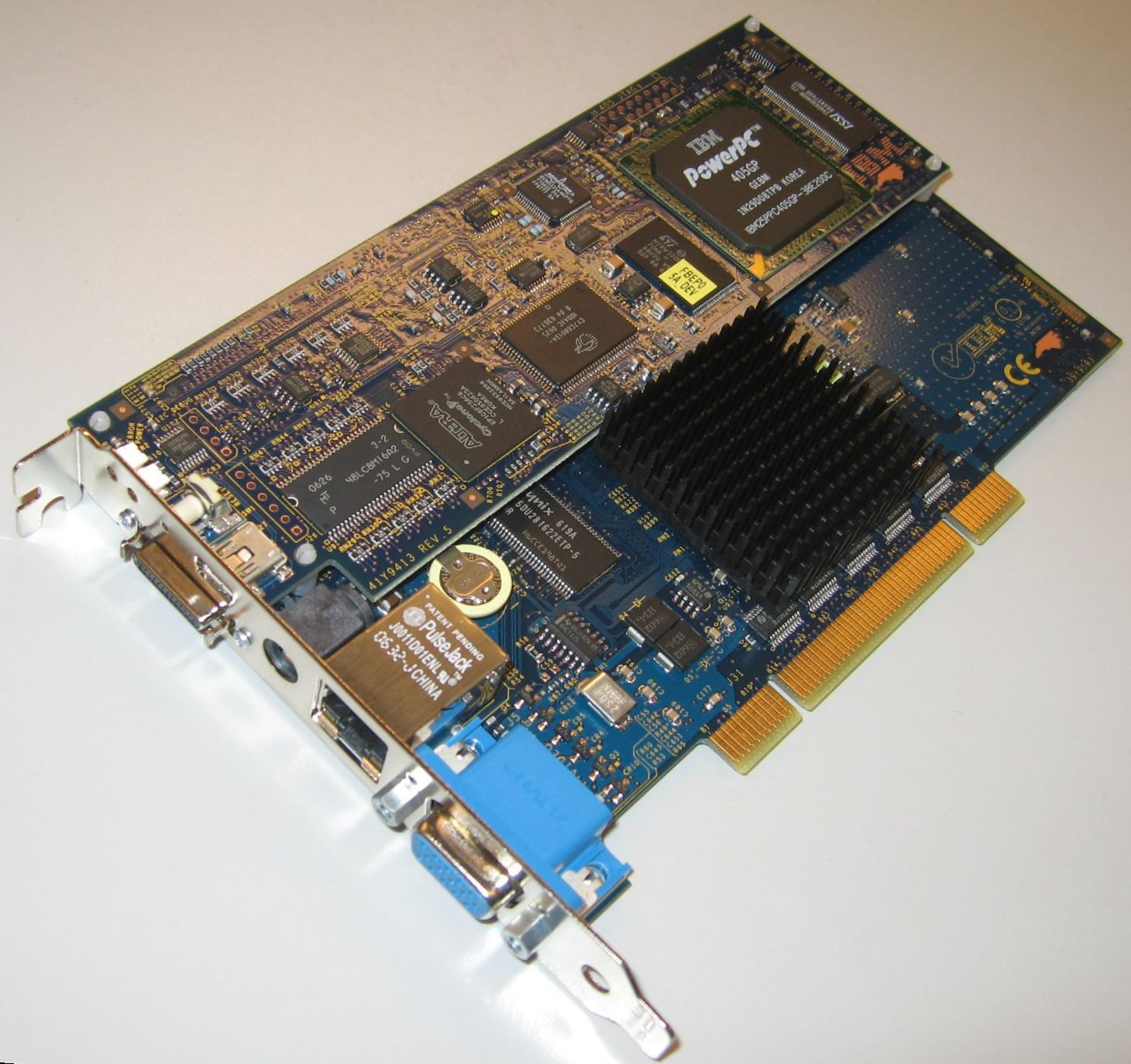
RSA-II card

This is a half-length full-height PCI adapter, which can be accessed either in-band through a device driver, or out-band over serial or Ethernet.

In addition, this adapter supports chaining of IBM Servers with Integrated Systems Management Processors (ISMP) using RJ45 patch cables (RS-485 signal), to reduce the number of adapters required.

This adapter (when properly cabled) can be accessed for in-band management through a USB driver.

This adapter has its own ATI video chip, and will cause the onboard video chip to get disabled. The reason for this was to resolve some of the problems with capturing the video for the remote KVM function that the original RSA experienced. Just like the original RSA, in the event of chaining the remote KVM function is only supported on the server with the adapter installed.

Supported servers:

- IBM eServer 326, 326m
- IBM eServer xSeries 206, 225 (8649), 226, 235, 255
- IBM eServer xSeries 305, 306, 306m, 335, 345, 365
- IBM eServer xSeries 445

The RSA-II requires a 20-pin cable to attach to the motherboard of the server. Without this cable the remote video facilities will still work, and if the external USB cable is connected, the remote keyboard and mouse will work—but nothing else (including power control) will function properly. Moreover, some servers will pause for 30–120 seconds after power-on if the RSA-II is installed but the cable is missing.

Different cables are required for different servers, and as of April 2008 it appears that the cards themselves are far more plentiful on the used market than certain cables—often the cables sell for more than the cards themselves!

Here is a table of known server/cablenumber combinations:

- eServer 326 uses cable 73P9312
- x345 uses cable 02R1661

Older servers use what is known as the "planar cable". Newer servers use the cable shown in the adjacent image:

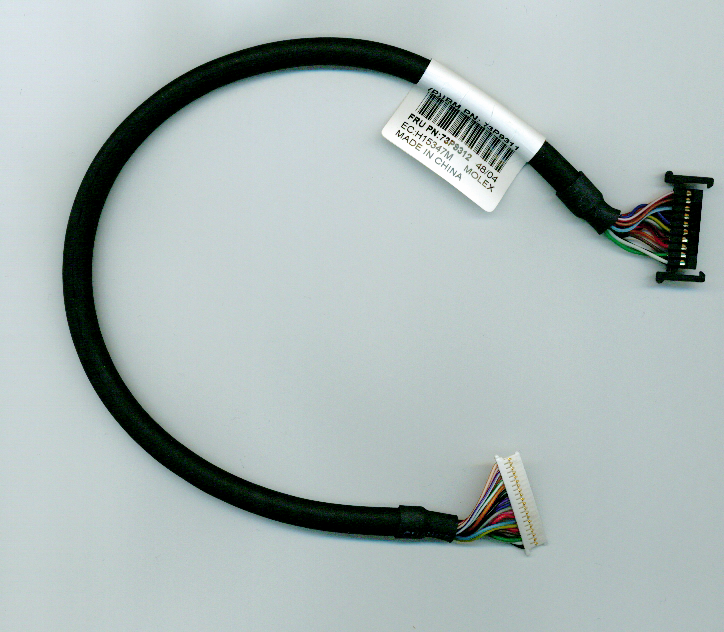
One type of IBM Remote Supervisor Adapter II internal cable (73P9312)

=== Remote Supervisor Adapter II Slimline (RSA-II Slimline) ===
This is a special version of the RSA-II that does not need a PCI slot. Instead it is plugged into a dedicated slot on the systemboard, like a Mini PCI adapter. This version also does not have a video controller anymore like the RSA-II.

Out-band management is provided by a dedicated Ethernet port on the server, which is not connected if the RSA-II Slimline is not installed. In-Band management is provided by the same USB driver as the RSA-II.

Supported servers:

- IBM eServer xSeries 236, 260
- IBM eServer xSeries 336, 346, 366
- IBM eServer xSeries 460, MXE-460
- IBM System x 3200, 3250, 3350, 3400, 3500, 3550, 3650, 3655, 3755, 3800, 3850, 3950

== Related ==
=== BladeCenter Management Module (BCMM) ===
This is the first management module of the IBM BladeCenter.

Its function is very similar to that of the RSA-II

The BCMM provides an external 10/100Mbit Ethernet connection (used for out-of-band management) and shared VGA, PS/2 Keyboard and PS/2 Mouse ports. Internally the VGA and PS/2 ports are switchable between blades. The PS/2 ports are internally seen to the blades as USB.

This has since been phased out and replaced by the BCAMM. It is no longer supported by IBM.

=== BladeCenter Advanced Management Module (BCAMM) ===
This is a hardware refresh of the management module for the IBM BladeCenter. The PS/2 ports for keyboard and mouse were replaced with two USB ports. The BCAMM is currently under active development and its firmware offers more capabilities than the original BCMM.

=== Advanced Systems Management Processor (ASMP) ===
This is an integrated Service Processor on select IBM Intel-based servers. It was succeeded by the ISMP. Out-of-band management is possible using a serial port (shared with the OS), or by adding the Advanced Systems Management Adapter (ASMA).

These servers have ASMP functionality:

- IBM Netfinity 4500R
- IBM Netfinity 5000, 5100, 5500, 5600
- IBM Netfinity 6000R
- IBM Netfinity 7100, 7600
- IBM xSeries 130 (8654), 135 (8654), 150
- IBM xSeries 230, 240, 250
- IBM xSeries 330, 340, 350

=== Integrated Systems Management Processor (ISMP) ===
This is an integrated Service Processor on select IBM Intel-based servers. It was succeeded by the BMC (Baseboard Management Controller). Out-of-band management is possible by adding the RSA or RSA II.

These servers have ISMP functionality:

- IBM xSeries 232, 235, 236, 255
- IBM xSeries 335, 342, 345

=== Baseboard Management Controller (BMC) ===
On many legacy IBM Intel-based servers the BMC is standard with the RSA II or RSA II Slimline as an Option device.

=== Integrated Management Module (IMM) ===
The IBM Integrated Management Module (IMM) is the next generation of System Management devices for UEFI based servers and comprises features and functionality of the legacy Baseboard Management Controller (BMC), Remote Supervisor Adapter II (RSA II) while incorporating the Super I/O controller and Video controller.

The IMM interfaces with the server's UEFI System firmware (Unified Extensible Firmware Interface) to provide system management monitoring and functionality.

Although some issues known to both the RSA II and BMC may have been migrated to the early IMM generations (in addition to the IMM's own unique issues), most of these issues have been resolved while adding some of greatly improved features and Administrator / User experience over the BMC and RSA II predecessors.

For example:

- Advanced Predictive Failure Analysis (PFA)
- Configurable IMM Dedicated or Shared Ethernet connection
- Virtual Light Path Diagnostic
- Email alerts
- Remote Firmware updating
- Remote Power control, Remote Console / control of both hardware and Operating System
- OS failure screen shot capture
- Remote Mounting of Virtual Devices such as CD/DVD drive, USB Flash Drives, ISO / Disk images and Diskette drive

== See also ==
- HP iLO
- Dell DRAC
- Sun SSP
- Real Weasel
- Cisco CIMC
