= HP NetServer =

Family of server and workstation computers

NetServer
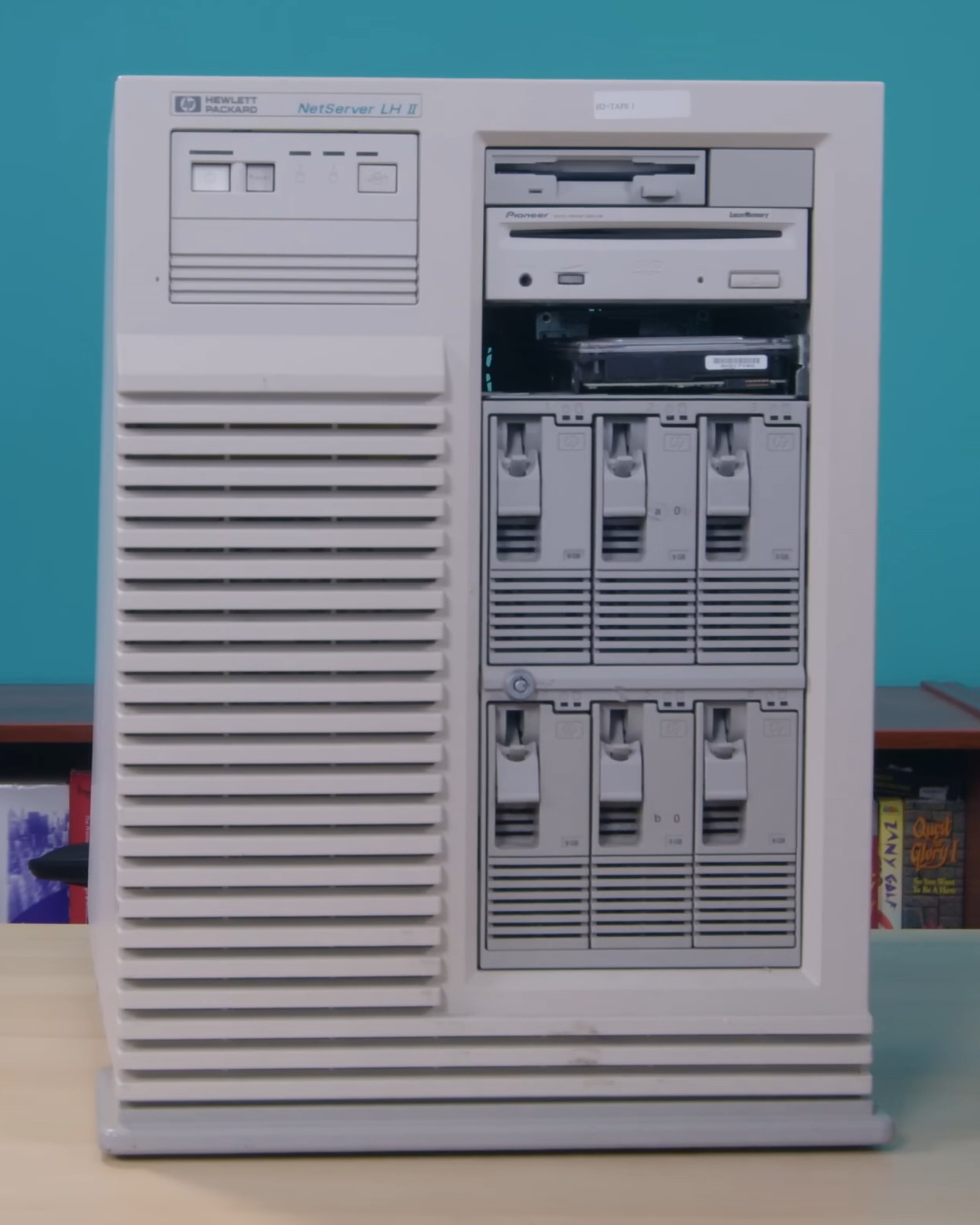
- NetServer LH II, dual Pentium II deskside tower from 1998
- Developer: Hewlett-Packard
- Type: Server; Workstation
- Released: May 17, 1993; 33 years ago
- Discontinued: 2002; 24 years ago
- CPU: i486SX; i486; Pentium; Pentium II; Pentium III
- Successor: ProLiant (servers)

NetServer was a line of x86-based server and workstation computers sold by Hewlett-Packard (HP) from 1993 to 2002. It was Hewlett-Packard's first entry in the commodity local area networking (LAN) market.

The NetServer line comprised a wide range of models featuring differing form factors and processor configurations.

NetServer was succeeded by ProLiant in 2002, a line of servers previously owned by Compaq whom HP acquired in 2002 (and now owned by Hewlett Packard Enterprise since 2015).

== History ==
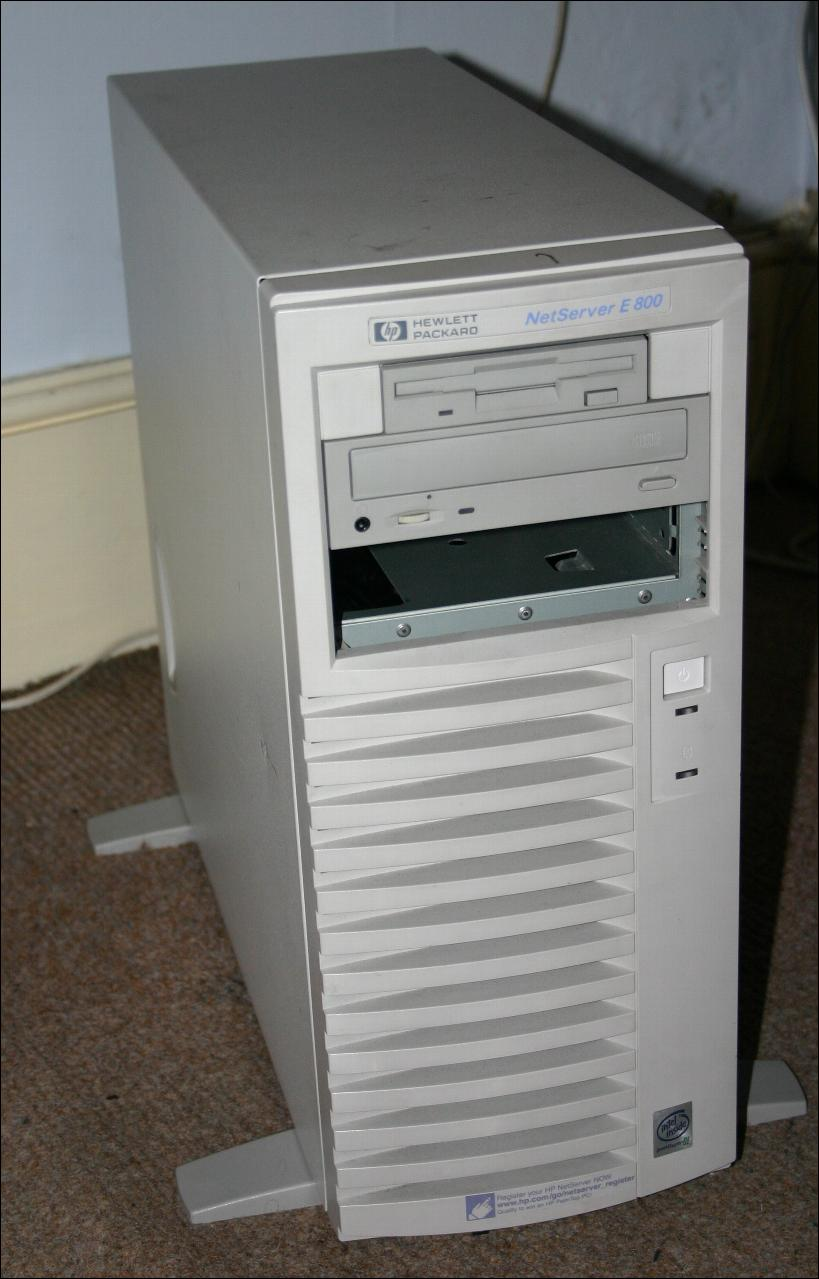
NetServer E 800, dual Pentium III server tower from 1999

Hewlett-Packard introduced the x86-based NetServer line of servers and workstations in May 1993, with the LE series and LM series. The NetServer LE low-cost option, sporting a minitower case. The cheapest model in the LE range features a 33-MHz i486SX chip, 4 MB of memory, and no built-in hard disk drives (a Fast SCSI controller card was preinstalled, however, for aftermarket hard drive installation; up to four hard drives can be installed internally, with a RAID controller optional). More higher-end models in the LE range feature i486 and DX2 processors clocked at 33 MHz and 66 MHz, respectively. The NetServer LM series, meanwhile, sported cases twice as wide (the so-called deskside form factor) in order to accommodate up to eight hard drives in a RAID 0, RAID 1, or RAID 5 array. These LM-series NetServers featured either a 33-MHz i486, a 66-MHz DX2, or single or dual Pentium processors. The entire NetServer line initially competed with HP's own RISC-based 9000 line of workstations as well as Compaq's ProLiant line of servers that were introduced around the same time, of which HP would ultimately acquire later on in 2002. The LE-series models were released to market on May 17, 1993; the LM-series models were scheduled to ship later in July.

Later entries in the NetServer line featured single or dual Pentium II and Pentium III processors.

HP acquired Compaq in 2002, which accounted for HP borrowing numerous different product lines from the previously independent company. With this, HP discontinued the NetServer line that same year, replacing it with the ProLiant line of servers that were originally introduced by Compaq back in 1993 as a competitor to the NetServer at that time.

== See also ==
- IBM PS/2 Server
- Dell PowerEdge
