= Sun Netra =

The Sun Netra brand has been used for a variety of server computers from Sun Microsystems since 1994. The original Netra servers (such as the Netra i and Netra j models) were re-badged SPARCstation and Sun Ultra series systems bundled with (web) server application software.

Later the Netra name was mainly used for a series of ruggedized Network Equipment-Building System (NEBS)-certified carrier grade servers for telecommunications applications. Those often came with 48V DC power input, and adjusted cases. The most custom of those were the CompactPCI models, i.e. Netra CP1405, consisting of not much more than one CPU board.
