= HPE Systems Insight Manager =

HPE Systems Insight Manager (HPE SIM, formerly HP Systems Insight Manager or HP SIM) is a proprietary systems management tool designed to help manage HPE servers.

HPE SIM is the basis for the HPE system management tools and is part of HPE's unified infrastructure management strategy.

Web-Based Enterprise Management were rolled into this product as of revision 5.6 with the ability to analyze the System Event Log.
