= Compaq ProSignia =

Discontinued computer brand

- Developer: Compaq
- Type: Affordable servers, business desktops and laptops.
- Released: 1992-1999
- Predecessor: Compaq Armada, Compaq SystemPro
- Successor: Compaq Professional Workstation

The Compaq ProSignia is a discontinued computer brand by Compaq for small businesses. It was the mid-range successor to the Compaq SystemPro brand. It was discontinued in 2000.

== Desktops ==
- 5/60
- 200
- 330: Mid-Tower - Intel Pentium III 500 MHz - 128 MB / up to 384 MB
- 600

== Servers ==
- VS: Mid-Tower, EISA bus, i486 CPU (SX/33, DX/33, DX2/66), integrated Ethernet and SCSI
- 300: Mid-Tower, EISA/PCI bus, Pentium (75, 90 or 120 MHz), integrated Ethernet and PCI SCSI
- 500: Full-Tower, EISA/PCI bus, Pentium (120 or 150Mhz), ECC memory, integrated PCI Ethernet and SCSI

== Laptops ==
=== ProSignia 150 ===
Presario-based. 1999. 50 mm × 313 mm × 257 mm; 12.1-inch (800×600) or 14.1-inch (1024×768) screen (3.3 or 3.6 kg). ATI Technologies RAGE LT PRO. 32/64 MB soldered to motherboard, up to 160/192 MB (1 slot). AMD K6-2 (350-475).

=== ProSignia 170 ===
1999. Low-end version of Armada M700.

314 mm × 249 mm × 28 mm; Pointing stick or touchpad. 2.1+ kg. Pentium II or III (366 or 450-700, instead 650-1000). 6–18 GB HDD. 13.3- or 14-inch screen. ATI Mobility P (8 MB). Magnesium top cover. MultiBay. Optional LS120 drive 32 MB (PII version, up to 288 MB) or 64 MB (PIII version, up to 320 MB) RAM.
